This is a list of all virus species, including satellites and viroids. Excluded are other ranks, and other non-cellular life such as prions. Also excluded are common names and obsolete names for viruses.

 For a list of virus families and subfamilies, see List of virus families and subfamilies.
 For a list of virus genera, see List of virus genera.
 For a list of virus realms, subrealms, kingdoms, subkingdoms, phyla, subphyla, classes, subclasses, orders, and suborders, see List of higher virus taxa.

A

Aalivirus A
Abaca bunchy top virus
Abutilon golden mosaic virus
Abutilon mosaic Bolivia virus
Abutilon mosaic Brazil virus
Abutilon mosaic virus
Abutilon yellows virus
Acanthamoeba polyphaga mimivirus
Acanthocystis turfacea chlorella virus 1
Acara orthobunyavirus
Acerodon celebensis polyomavirus 1
Acerodon celebensis polyomavirus 2
Achimota pararubulavirus 1
Achimota pararubulavirus 2
Acholeplasma virus L2
Acholeplasma virus L51
Achromobacter virus 83-24
Achromobacter virus Axp3
Achromobacter virus JWAlpha
Achromobacter virus JWX
Acidianus bottle-shaped virus
Acidianus filamentous virus 1
Acidianus filamentous virus 2
Acidianus filamentous virus 3
Acidianus filamentous virus 6
Acidianus filamentous virus 7
Acidianus filamentous virus 8
Acidianus filamentous virus 9
Acidianus rod-shaped virus 1
Acidianus spindle-shaped virus 1
Acidianus two-tailed virus
Acidovorax virus ACP17
Acinetobacter virus 133
Acinetobacter virus AB1
Acinetobacter virus AB2
Acinetobacter virus AB3
Acinetobacter virus AbC62
Acinetobacter virus AbKT21III
Acinetobacter virus Abp1
Acinetobacter virus AbP2
Acinetobacter virus Aci01-1
Acinetobacter virus Aci02-2
Acinetobacter virus Aci05
Acinetobacter virus Aci07
Acinetobacter virus Aci08
Acinetobacter virus Acibel007
Acinetobacter virus AP22
Acinetobacter virus AS11
Acinetobacter virus AS12
Acinetobacter virus B1251
Acinetobacter virus Fri1
Acinetobacter virus IME200
Acinetobacter virus IMEAB3
Acinetobacter virus Loki
Acinetobacter virus LZ35
Acinetobacter virus ME3
Acinetobacter virus PD6A3
Acinetobacter virus PDAB9
Acinetobacter virus Petty
Acinetobacter virus phiAB1
Acinetobacter virus R3177
Acinetobacter virus SH-Ab 15519
Acinetobacter virus SWHAb1
Acinetobacter virus SWHAb3
Acinetobacter virus WCHABP1
Acinetobacter virus WCHABP12
Acinetobacter virus WCHABP5
Acintetobacter virus B1
Acintetobacter virus B2
Acintetobacter virus B5
Acintetobacter virus D2
Acintetobacter virus P1
Acintetobacter virus P2
Acintetobacter virus phiAB6
Acipenserid herpesvirus 2
Aconitum latent virus
Acrobasis zelleri entomopoxvirus
Actinidia chlorotic ringspot-associated emaravirus
Actinidia seed borne latent virus
Actinidia virus 1
Actinidia virus A
Actinidia virus B
Actinidia virus X
Actinomyces virus Av1
Acute bee paralysis virus
Adana phlebovirus
Adelaide River ephemerovirus
Adeno-associated dependoparvovirus A
Adeno-associated dependoparvovirus B
Adoxophyes honmai entomopoxvirus
Adoxophyes honmai nucleopolyhedrovirus
Adoxophyes orana granulovirus
Aedes aegypti entomopoxvirus
Aedes aegypti Mosqcopia virus
Aedes pseudoscutellaris reovirus
Aeonium ringspot virus
Aeromonas virus 25
Aeromonas virus 25AhydR2PP
Aeromonas virus 43
Aeromonas virus 44RR2
Aeromonas virus 56
Aeromonas virus 65
Aeromonas virus Aeh1
Aeromonas virus Aes12
Aeromonas virus Aes508
Aeromonas virus Ahp1
Aeromonas virus AhSzq1
Aeromonas virus AhSzw1
Aeromonas virus AS4
Aeromonas virus AS7
Aeromonas virus Asgz
Aeromonas virus CF7
Aeromonas virus pAh6C
Aeromonas virus phiO18P
Aeromonas virus pIS4A
Aeromonas virus ZPAH7
Aeropyrum coil-shaped virus
Aeropyrum pernix bacilliform virus 1
Aeropyrum pernix ovoid virus 1
African cassava mosaic Burkina Faso virus
African cassava mosaic virus
African eggplant mosaic virus
African horse sickness virus
African oil palm ringspot virus
African swine fever virus
Agaricus bisporus alphaendornavirus 1
Agaricus bisporus virus 4
Ageratum enation alphasatellite
Ageratum enation virus
Ageratum latent virus
Ageratum leaf curl Buea betasatellite
Ageratum leaf curl Cameroon betasatellite
Ageratum leaf curl Sichuan virus
Ageratum leaf curl virus
Ageratum yellow leaf curl betasatellite
Ageratum yellow vein alphasatellite
Ageratum yellow vein betasatellite
Ageratum yellow vein China alphasatellite
Ageratum yellow vein Hualian virus
Ageratum yellow vein India alphasatellite
Ageratum yellow vein India betasatellite
Ageratum yellow vein Singapore alphasatellite
Ageratum yellow vein Sri Lanka betasatellite
Ageratum yellow vein Sri Lanka virus
Ageratum yellow vein virus
Aglaonema bacilliform virus
Agrobacterium virus 7-7-1
Agrobacterium virus Atuph02
Agrobacterium virus Atuph03
Agrobacterium virus Atuph07
Agropyron mosaic virus
Agrotis ipsilon multiple nucleopolyhedrovirus
Agrotis segetum granulovirus
Agrotis segetum nucleopolyhedrovirus A
Agrotis segetum nucleopolyhedrovirus B
Aguacate phlebovirus
Ahlum waterborne virus
Aichivirus A
Aichivirus B
Aichivirus C
Aichivirus D
Aichivirus E
Aichivirus F
Ailurivirus A
Ailuropoda melanoleuca polyomavirus 1
Aino orthobunyavirus
Air potato ampelovirus 1
Akabane orthobunyavirus
Akhmeta virus
Alagoas vesiculovirus
Alajuela orthobunyavirus
Alcelaphine gammaherpesvirus 1
Alcelaphine gammaherpesvirus 2
Alcube phlebovirus
Alefpapillomavirus 1
Alenquer phlebovirus
Alfalfa betanucleorhabdovirus
Alfalfa cryptic virus 1
Alfalfa dwarf cytorhabdovirus
Alfalfa enamovirus 1
Alfalfa leaf curl virus
Alfalfa mosaic virus
Alfalfa virus S
Algerian watermelon mosaic virus
Allamanda leaf curl virus
Allamanda leaf mottle distortion virus
Alligatorweed stunting virus
Allium cepa amalgavirus 1
Allium cepa amalgavirus 2
Allium virus X
Allpahuayo mammarenavirus
Almpiwar sripuvirus
Alphaarterivirus equid
Alphacoronavirus 1
Alphalipothrixvirus SBFV2
Alphalipothrixvirus SFV1
Alphamesonivirus 1
Alphamesonivirus 10
Alphamesonivirus 2
Alphamesonivirus 3
Alphamesonivirus 4
Alphamesonivirus 5
Alphamesonivirus 6
Alphamesonivirus 7
Alphamesonivirus 8
Alphamesonivirus 9
Alphapapillomavirus 1
Alphapapillomavirus 10
Alphapapillomavirus 11
Alphapapillomavirus 12
Alphapapillomavirus 13
Alphapapillomavirus 14
Alphapapillomavirus 2
Alphapapillomavirus 3
Alphapapillomavirus 4
Alphapapillomavirus 5
Alphapapillomavirus 6
Alphapapillomavirus 7
Alphapapillomavirus 8
Alphapapillomavirus 9
Alphapleolipovirus HHPV1
Alphapleolipovirus HHPV2
Alphapleolipovirus HRPV1
Alphapleolipovirus HRPV2
Alphapleolipovirus HRPV6
Alphaportoglobovirus SPV2
Alphaproteobacteria virus phiJl001
Alpinia mosaic virus
Alpinia oxyphylla mosaic virus
Alstroemeria mosaic virus
Alstroemeria necrotic streak orthotospovirus
Alstroemeria virus X
Alstroemeria yellow spot orthotospovirus
Alternanthera mild mosaic virus
Alternanthera mosaic virus
Alternanthera yellow vein betasatellite
Alternanthera yellow vein virus
Alternaria alternata chrysovirus
Alternaria brassicicola betaendornavirus 1
Alteromonas virus H4-4
Alxa mammarenavirus
Amaranthus leaf mottle virus
Amasya cherry disease associated chrysovirus
Amazon lily mild mottle virus
Amazon lily mosaic virus
Ambe phlebovirus
Ambystoma tigrinum virus
American bat vesiculovirus
American dog uukuvirus
American hop latent virus
American plum line pattern virus
Ampivirus A
Amsacta moorei entomopoxvirus
Anadyr orthobunyavirus
Anagyris vein yellowing virus
Anatid alphaherpesvirus 1
Anativirus A
Anativirus B
Andean potato latent virus
Andean potato mild mosaic virus
Andean potato mottle virus
Andes orthohantavirus
Andrographis yellow vein leaf curl betasatellite
Andrographis yellow vein leaf curl virus
Angelica bushy stunt virus
Angelica virus Y
Angelonia flower break virus
Anguillid herpesvirus 1
Anguillid perhabdovirus
Anhanga phlebovirus
Anhembi orthobunyavirus
Anomala cuprea entomopoxvirus
Anopheles A orthobunyavirus
Anopheles B orthobunyavirus
Anopheles gambiae Moose virus
Anopheles minimus iridovirus
Anopheles orthophasmavirus
Anser anser polyomavirus 1
Anseriform dependoparvovirus 1
Ant associated cyclovirus 1
Antheraea eucalypti virus
Antheraea pernyi iflavirus
Antheraea pernyi nucleopolyhedrovirus
Antheraea semotivirus Tamy
Anthoxanthum latent blanching virus
Anthriscus yellows virus
Anthurium mosaic-associated chrysovirus
Anticarsia gemmatalis multiple nucleopolyhedrovirus
Aotine betaherpesvirus 1
Apanteles crassicornis bracovirus
Apanteles fumiferanae bracovirus
Aphid lethal paralysis virus
Aphodius tasmaniae entomopoxvirus
Apium virus Y
Aplysia abyssovirus 1
Apoi virus
Apple associated luteovirus
Apple chlorotic leaf spot virus
Apple dimple fruit viroid
Apple hammerhead viroid
Apple latent spherical virus
Apple luteovirus 1
Apple mosaic virus
Apple rubodvirus 1
Apple rubodvirus 2
Apple scar skin viroid
Apple stem grooving virus
Apple stem pitting virus
Apricot latent ringspot virus
Apricot latent virus
Apricot pseudo-chlorotic leaf spot virus
Apricot vein clearing associated virus
Aquamavirus A
Aquamicrobium virus P14
Aquareovirus A
Aquareovirus B
Aquareovirus C
Aquareovirus D
Aquareovirus E
Aquareovirus F
Aquareovirus G
Arabidopsis thaliana Art1 virus
Arabidopsis thaliana Athila virus
Arabidopsis thaliana AtRE1 virus
Arabidopsis thaliana Endovir virus
Arabidopsis thaliana evelknievel virus
Arabidopsis thaliana Ta1 virus
Arabidopsis thaliana Tat4 virus
Arabis mosaic virus
Arachis pintoi virus
Araujia mosaic virus
Aravan lyssavirus
Arboretum almendravirus
Areca palm necrotic ringspot virus
Areca palm necrotic spindle-spot virus
Areca palm velarivirus 1
Argas mivirus
Argentinian mammarenavirus
Aroa virus
Arphia conspersa entomopoxvirus
Arracacha mottle virus
Arracacha virus 1
Arracacha virus A
Arracacha virus B
Arracacha virus V
Artashat orthonairovirus
Artemisia virus A
Arthobacter virus Liebe
Arthobacter virus Sonali
Arthobacter virus Yang
Arthrobacter virus Abidatro
Arthrobacter virus Adat
Arthrobacter virus Amigo
Arthrobacter virus Andrew
Arthrobacter virus ArV1
Arthrobacter virus BarretLemon
Arthrobacter virus Beans
Arthrobacter virus Bennie
Arthrobacter virus Brent
Arthrobacter virus Bridgette
Arthrobacter virus Captnmurica
Arthrobacter virus Circum
Arthrobacter virus Colucci
Arthrobacter virus Constance
Arthrobacter virus Coral
Arthrobacter virus Decurro
Arthrobacter virus DrManhattan
Arthrobacter virus DrRobert
Arthrobacter virus Eileen
Arthrobacter virus Galaxy
Arthrobacter virus Glenn
Arthrobacter virus Gordon
Arthrobacter virus HunterDalle
Arthrobacter virus Jasmine
Arthrobacter virus Jawnski
Arthrobacter virus Joann
Arthrobacter virus Judy
Arthrobacter virus Kellezzio
Arthrobacter virus Kepler
Arthrobacter virus Kitkat
Arthrobacter virus Korra
Arthrobacter virus Laroye
Arthrobacter virus Maja
Arthrobacter virus Martha
Arthrobacter virus Mudcat
Arthrobacter virus Peas
Arthrobacter virus Piccoletto
Arthrobacter virus Preamble
Arthrobacter virus Pumancara
Arthrobacter virus Shade
Arthrobacter virus Sonny
Arthrobacter virus Tank
Arthrobacter virus Trina
Arthrobacter virus Wayne
Arthrobacteria virus Molivia
Artibeus planirostris polyomavirus 1
Artibeus planirostris polyomavirus 2
Artibeus planirostris polyomavirus 3
Artichoke Aegean ringspot virus
Artichoke Italian latent virus
Artichoke latent virus
Artichoke mottled crinkle virus
Artichoke yellow ringspot virus
Artogeia rapae granulovirus
Aruac arurhavirus
Arumowot phlebovirus
Asama orthohantavirus
Ascaris lumbricoides Tas virus
Ascogaster argentifrons bracovirus
Ascogaster quadridentata bracovirus
Ash gourd yellow vein mosaic alphasatellite
Ashivirus S45C4
Asian prunus virus 1
Asian prunus virus 2
Asikkala orthohantavirus
Asparagus virus 1
Asparagus virus 2
Asparagus virus 3
Aspergillus foetidus slow virus 1
Aspergillus fumigatus chrysovirus
Aspergillus fumigatus polymycovirus 1
Aspergillus ochraceous virus
Aspergillus spelaeus polymycovirus 1
Astarnavirus
Asteroid aquambidensovirus 1
Asystasia mosaic Madagascar virus
Ateles paniscus polyomavirus 1
Ateline alphaherpesvirus 1
Ateline gammaherpesvirus 2
Ateline gammaherpesvirus 3
Atkinsonella hypoxylon virus
Atractylodes mild mottle virus
Atractylodes mottle virus
Aura virus
Aurantiochytrium single-stranded RNA virus 01
Australian bat lyssavirus
Australian grapevine viroid
Autographa californica multiple nucleopolyhedrovirus
Avastrovirus 1
Avastrovirus 2
Avastrovirus 3
Aves polyomavirus 1
Avian carcinoma Mill Hill virus 2
Avian coronavirus
Avian coronavirus 9203
Avian dependoparvovirus 1
Avian leukosis virus
Avian metaavulavirus 10
Avian metaavulavirus 11
Avian metaavulavirus 14
Avian metaavulavirus 15
Avian metaavulavirus 2
Avian metaavulavirus 20
Avian metaavulavirus 5
Avian metaavulavirus 6
Avian metaavulavirus 7
Avian metaavulavirus 8
Avian metapneumovirus
Avian myeloblastosis virus
Avian myelocytomatosis virus 29
Avian orthoavulavirus 1
Avian orthoavulavirus 12
Avian orthoavulavirus 13
Avian orthoavulavirus 16
Avian orthoavulavirus 17
Avian orthoavulavirus 18
Avian orthoavulavirus 19
Avian orthoavulavirus 21
Avian orthoavulavirus 9
Avian orthoreovirus
Avian paraavulavirus 3
Avian paraavulavirus 4
Avian sarcoma virus CT10
Avihepatovirus A
Avisivirus A
Avisivirus B
Avisivirus C
Avocado sunblotch viroid
Avon-Heathcote Estuary associated kieseladnavirus
Axonopus compressus streak virus
Ayaqvirus S45C18

B

Baboon orthoreovirus
Bacillus virus 1
Bacillus virus 250
Bacillus virus Agate
Bacillus virus Andromeda
Bacillus virus AP50
Bacillus virus AvesoBmore
Bacillus virus B103
Bacillus virus B4
Bacillus virus Bam35
Bacillus virus Bastille
Bacillus virus Bc431
Bacillus virus Bcp1
Bacillus virus BCP78
Bacillus virus BCP82
Bacillus virus Bigbertha
Bacillus virus Blastoid
Bacillus virus BM15
Bacillus virus BMBtp2
Bacillus virus Bobb
Bacillus virus Bp8pC
Bacillus virus BPS10C
Bacillus virus BPS13
Bacillus virus CAM003
Bacillus virus Camphawk
Bacillus virus CP51
Bacillus virus Curly
Bacillus virus Deepblue
Bacillus virus Eoghan
Bacillus virus Evoli
Bacillus virus Finn
Bacillus virus G
Bacillus virus GA1
Bacillus virus GIL16
Bacillus virus Glittering
Bacillus virus Grass
Bacillus virus Hakuna
Bacillus virus HoodyT
Bacillus virus IEBH
Bacillus virus JBP901
Bacillus virus JL
Bacillus virus Mater
Bacillus virus Megatron
Bacillus virus Mgbh1
Bacillus virus Moonbeam
Bacillus virus NIT1
Bacillus virus Page
Bacillus virus Palmer
Bacillus virus Pascal
Bacillus virus PBS1
Bacillus virus phi29
Bacillus virus Pony
Bacillus virus Pookie
Bacillus virus Riggi
Bacillus virus Riley
Bacillus virus Shanette
Bacillus virus Shbh1
Bacillus virus SIOphi
Bacillus virus Slash
Bacillus virus SP15
Bacillus virus SPbeta
Bacillus virus SPG24
Bacillus virus SPO1
Bacillus virus Spock
Bacillus virus Stahl
Bacillus virus Staley
Bacillus virus Stills
Bacillus virus Taylor
Bacillus virus TP21
Bacillus virus Troll
Bacillus virus TsarBomba
Bacillus virus Wbeta
Bacillus virus Wip1
Bacillus virus WPh
Badger associated gemykibivirus 1
Badu phasivirus
Bagaza virus
Bahia barhavirus
Bakau orthobunyavirus
Ball python nidovirus 1
Balsa almendravirus
Bamboo mosaic virus
Banana bract mosaic virus
Banana bunchy top alphasatellite 1
Banana bunchy top alphasatellite 2
Banana bunchy top alphasatellite 3
Banana bunchy top virus
Banana mild mosaic virus
Banana streak GF virus
Banana streak IM virus
Banana streak MY virus
Banana streak OL virus
Banana streak UA virus
Banana streak UI virus
Banana streak UL virus
Banana streak UM virus
Banana streak VN virus
Banana virus X
Banna virus
Banzi virus
Barbacena virus Y
Barbel circovirus
Barfin flounder nervous necrosis virus
Barley mild mosaic virus
Barley stripe mosaic virus
Barley yellow dwarf virus GPV
Barley yellow dwarf virus kerII
Barley yellow dwarf virus kerIII
Barley yellow dwarf virus MAV
Barley yellow dwarf virus PAS
Barley yellow dwarf virus PAV
Barley yellow dwarf virus SGV
Barley yellow mosaic virus
Barley yellow striate mosaic cytorhabdovirus
Barmah Forest virus
Barnacle hexartovirus
Barnacle mivirus
Barur ledantevirus
Bas-Congo tibrovirus
Basella alba alphaendornavirus 1
Basella rugose mosaic virus
Bat associated circovirus 1
Bat associated circovirus 10
Bat associated circovirus 11
Bat associated circovirus 12
Bat associated circovirus 2
Bat associated circovirus 3
Bat associated circovirus 4
Bat associated circovirus 5
Bat associated circovirus 6
Bat associated circovirus 7
Bat associated circovirus 8
Bat associated circovirus 9
Bat associated cyclovirus 1
Bat associated cyclovirus 10
Bat associated cyclovirus 11
Bat associated cyclovirus 12
Bat associated cyclovirus 13
Bat associated cyclovirus 14
Bat associated cyclovirus 15
Bat associated cyclovirus 16
Bat associated cyclovirus 2
Bat associated cyclovirus 3
Bat associated cyclovirus 4
Bat associated cyclovirus 5
Bat associated cyclovirus 6
Bat associated cyclovirus 7
Bat associated cyclovirus 8
Bat associated cyclovirus 9
Bat coronavirus CDPHE15
Bat coronavirus HKU10
Bat Hp-betacoronavirus Zhejiang2013
Bat mastadenovirus A
Bat mastadenovirus B
Bat mastadenovirus C
Bat mastadenovirus D
Bat mastadenovirus E
Bat mastadenovirus F
Bat mastadenovirus G
Bat mastadenovirus H
Bat mastadenovirus I
Bat mastadenovirus J
Batai orthobunyavirus
Batama orthobunyavirus
Batfish actinovirus
Bavaria virus
Bayou orthohantavirus
Bdellovibrio virus MAC1
Bdellovibrio virus MH2K
Beak and feather disease virus
Bean calico mosaic virus
Bean chlorosis virus
Bean common mosaic necrosis virus
Bean common mosaic virus
Bean dwarf mosaic virus
Bean golden mosaic virus
Bean golden yellow mosaic virus
Bean leaf crumple virus
Bean leafroll virus
Bean mild mosaic virus
Bean necrotic mosaic orthotospovirus
Bean pod mottle virus
Bean rugose mosaic virus
Bean white chlorosis mosaic virus
Bean yellow disorder virus
Bean yellow mosaic Mexico virus
Bean yellow mosaic virus
Bear Canyon mammarenavirus
Beatrice Hill tibrovirus
Beauveria bassiana polymycovirus 1
Beauveria bassiana victorivirus 1
Bebaru virus
Beet black scorch virus
Beet chlorosis virus
Beet cryptic virus 1
Beet cryptic virus 2
Beet cryptic virus 3
Beet curly top Iran virus
Beet curly top virus
Beet mild yellowing virus
Beet mosaic virus
Beet necrotic yellow vein virus
Beet pseudoyellows virus
Beet ringspot virus
Beet soil-borne mosaic virus
Beet soil-borne virus
Beet virus Q
Beet western yellows virus
Beet yellow stunt virus
Beet yellows virus
Beetle mivirus
Beihai berhavirus
Beihai crustavirus
Beihai peropuvirus
Beihai picobirnavirus
Beihai yingvirus
Beihai yuyuevirus
Beilong jeilongvirus
Bell pepper alphaendornavirus
Bell pepper mottle virus
Belladonna mottle virus
Bellavista orthobunyavirus
Bellflower vein chlorosis virus
Bellflower veinal mottle virus
Beluga whale coronavirus SW1
Benevides orthobunyavirus
Berisnavirus 1
Bermuda grass etched-line virus
Berrimah ephemerovirus
Bertioga orthobunyavirus
Betaarterivirus chinrav 1
Betaarterivirus ninrav
Betaarterivirus sheoin
Betaarterivirus suid 1
Betaarterivirus suid 2
Betaarterivirus timiclar
Betacoronavirus 1
Betapapillomavirus 1
Betapapillomavirus 2
Betapapillomavirus 3
Betapapillomavirus 4
Betapapillomavirus 5
Betapapillomavirus 6
Betapleolipovirus HGPV1
Betapleolipovirus HHPV3
Betapleolipovirus HHPV4
Betapleolipovirus HRPV10
Betapleolipovirus HRPV11
Betapleolipovirus HRPV12
Betapleolipovirus HRPV3
Betapleolipovirus HRPV9
Betapleolipovirus SNJ2
Bhanja bandavirus
Bhendi yellow vein alphasatellite
Bhendi yellow vein Bhubhaneswar virus
Bhendi yellow vein Haryana virus
Bhendi yellow vein mosaic betasatellite
Bhendi yellow vein mosaic Delhi virus
Bhendi yellow vein mosaic virus
Bidens mosaic virus
Bidens mottle virus
Bimiti orthobunyavirus
Birao orthobunyavirus
Birch leaf roll-associated virus
Birdsfoot trefoil enamovirus 1
Bitter gourd yellow mosaic virus
Black beetle virus
Black Creek Canal orthohantavirus
Black medic leaf roll virus
Black queen cell virus
Black raspberry necrosis virus
Black robin associated gemykibivirus 1
Blackberry chlorotic ringspot virus
Blackberry leaf mottle associated emaravirus
Blackberry vein banding-associated virus
Blackberry virus A
Blackberry virus E
Blackberry virus F
Blackberry virus S
Blackberry virus Y
Blackberry yellow vein-associated virus
Blackbird associated gemycircularvirus 1
Blackbird associated gemykibivirus 1
Blackcurrant betanucleorhabdovirus
Blackcurrant closterovirus 1
Blackcurrant reversion virus
Blackleg ixovirus
Blainvillea yellow spot virus
Blattodean blattambidensovirus 1
Blattodean pefuambidensovirus 1
Blechum interveinal chlorosis virus
Blechum yellow vein virus
Blotched snakehead virus
Blue gill hepatitis B virus
Blue squill virus A
Blueberry fruit drop associated virus
Blueberry latent spherical virus
Blueberry latent virus
Blueberry leaf mottle virus
Blueberry mosaic associated ophiovirus
Blueberry necrotic ring blotch virus
Blueberry red ringspot virus
Blueberry scorch virus
Blueberry shock virus
Blueberry shoestring virus
Blueberry virus A
Bluetongue virus
Boerhavia yellow spot virus
Bokeloh bat lyssavirus
Bolahun anphevirus
Bole mivirus
Bombali ebolavirus
Bombyx mori bidensovirus
Bombyx mori latent virus
Bombyx mori Mag virus
Bombyx mori nucleopolyhedrovirus
Bombyx mori Pao virus
Boolarra virus
Boosepivirus A
Boosepivirus B
Boosepivirus C
Bopivirus A
Bordetella virus BPP1
Bordetella virus CN1
Bordetella virus CN2
Bordetella virus FP1
Bordetella virus MW2
Bordetella virus PHB04
Bornean orangutan simian foamy virus
Bos taurus polyomavirus 1
Botambi orthobunyavirus
Botrylloides leachii nidovirus
Botryoshaeria dothidea polymycovirus 1
Botryosphaeria dothidea chrysovirus
Botrytis botoulivirus
Botrytis cinerea betaendornavirus 1
Botrytis porri botybirnavirus 1
Botrytis virus F
Botrytis virus X
Bouboui virus
Bougainvillea chlorotic vein banding virus
Bovine alphaherpesvirus 1
Bovine alphaherpesvirus 2
Bovine alphaherpesvirus 5
Bovine associated bovismacovirus 1
Bovine associated bovismacovirus 2
Bovine associated cosmacovirus 1
Bovine associated cyclovirus 1
Bovine associated drosmacovirus 1
Bovine associated gemycircularvirus 1
Bovine associated gemykibivirus 1
Bovine associated gemykrogvirus 1
Bovine associated huchismacovirus 1
Bovine associated huchismacovirus 2
Bovine associated porprismacovirus 1
Bovine atadenovirus D
Bovine fever ephemerovirus
Bovine foamy virus
Bovine gammaherpesvirus 4
Bovine gammaherpesvirus 6
Bovine immunodeficiency virus
Bovine leukemia virus
Bovine mastadenovirus A
Bovine mastadenovirus B
Bovine mastadenovirus C
Bovine nidovirus 1
Bovine orthopneumovirus
Bovine papular stomatitis virus
Bovine respirovirus 3
Bovine rhinitis A virus
Bovine rhinitis B virus
Bovine torovirus
Bowe orthohantavirus
Bozo orthobunyavirus
Brassica campestris chrysovirus
Brassica oleracea Melmoth virus
Brazilian mammarenavirus
Brevibacillus virus Abouo
Brevibacillus virus Davies
Brevibacillus virus Jenst
Brevibacillus virus Jimmer
Brevibacillus virus Osiris
Brevibacterium virus LuckyBarnes
Brevicoryne brassicae virus
Brisavirus
Britarnavirus 1
Britarnavirus 2
Britarnavirus 3
Britarnavirus 4
Brno loanvirus
Broad bean mottle virus
Broad bean necrosis virus
Broad bean stain virus
Broad bean true mosaic virus
Broad bean wilt virus 1
Broad bean wilt virus 2
Broad-leafed dock virus A
Broccoli necrotic yellows cytorhabdovirus
Brochothrix virus A9
Brome mosaic virus
Brome streak mosaic virus
Bromus associated gemycircularvirus 1
Bromus catharticus striate mosaic virus
Broome orthoreovirus
Brown greater galago prosimian foamy virus
Brucella virus Pr
Brucella virus Tb
Bruges orthohantavirus
Brugmansia mild mottle virus
Brugmansia mosaic virus
Brugmansia suaveolens mottle virus
Brunnich mivirus
Bubaline alphaherpesvirus 1
Buenaventura phlebovirus
Bujaru phlebovirus
Bukalasa bat virus
Bulbul coronavirus HKU11
Bundibugyo ebolavirus
Bunyamwera orthobunyavirus
Burdock mottle virus
Burdock yellows virus
Burkholderia virus AH2
Burkholderia virus AP3
Burkholderia virus Bcep1
Burkholderia virus Bcep22
Burkholderia virus Bcep43
Burkholderia virus Bcep781
Burkholderia virus BcepC6B
Burkholderia virus BcepF1
Burkholderia virus Bcepil02
Burkholderia virus Bcepmigl
Burkholderia virus BcepMu
Burkholderia virus BcepNazgul
Burkholderia virus BcepNY3
Burkholderia virus BpAMP1
Burkholderia virus DC1
Burkholderia virus JG068
Burkholderia virus KL1
Burkholderia virus KL3
Burkholderia virus KL4
Burkholderia virus KS14
Burkholderia virus KS5
Burkholderia virus phi1026b
Burkholderia virus phi52237
Burkholderia virus phi6442
Burkholderia virus phiE122
Burkholderia virus phiE125
Burkholderia virus phiE202
Burkholderia virus phiE255
Burkholderia virus ST79
Bushbush orthobunyavirus
Butterbur mosaic virus
Butterfly flower mosaic virus
Buttonwillow orthobunyavirus
Buzura suppressaria nucleopolyhedrovirus
Bwamba orthobunyavirus

C

Cabassou virus
Cabbage cytorhabdovirus
Cabbage leaf curl Jamaica virus
Cabbage leaf curl virus
Cacao bacilliform Sri Lanka virus
Cacao mild mosaic virus
Cacao phlebovirus
Cacao swollen shoot CD virus
Cacao swollen shoot CE virus
Cacao swollen shoot Ghana M virus
Cacao swollen shoot Ghana N virus
Cacao swollen shoot Ghana Q virus
Cacao swollen shoot Togo A virus
Cacao swollen shoot Togo B virus
Cacao yellow mosaic virus
Cacao yellow vein banding virus
Cache Valley orthobunyavirus
Cachoeira Porteira orthobunyavirus
Cacipacore virus
Cactus mild mottle virus
Cactus virus 2
Cactus virus X
Cadicivirus A
Cadicivirus B
Caenorhabditis elegans Cer1 virus
Caenorhabditis elegans Cer13 virus
Cafeteria roenbergensis virus
Cafeteriavirus-dependent mavirus
Caimito pacuvirus
Cajanus cajan Panzee virus
Caladenia virus A
Calanthe mild mosaic virus
Cali mammarenavirus
Calibrachoa mottle virus
California encephalitis orthobunyavirus
California reptarenavirus
Caligid hexartovirus
Caligus caligrhavirus
Calla lily chlorotic spot orthotospovirus
Calla lily latent virus
Callistephus mottle virus
Callitrichine gammaherpesvirus 3
Calopogonium yellow vein virus
Camel associated drosmacovirus 1
Camel associated drosmacovirus2
Camel associated porprismacovirus 1
Camel associated porprismacovirus 2
Camel associated porprismacovirus 3
Camel associated porprismacovirus 4
Camelpox virus
Campana phlebovirus
Campoletis aprilis ichnovirus
Campoletis flavicincta ichnovirus
Campoletis sonorensis ichnovirus
Camptochironomus tentans entomopoxvirus
Campylobacter virus CP21
Campylobacter virus CP220
Campylobacter virus CP30A
Campylobacter virus CP81
Campylobacter virus CPt10
Campylobacter virus CPX
Campylobacter virus IBB35
Campylobacter virus Los1
Campylobacter virus NCTC12673
Canary circovirus
Canarypox virus
Candida albicans Tca2 virus
Candida albicans Tca5 virus
Candiru phlebovirus
Canid alphaherpesvirus 1
Canine associated gemygorvirus 1
Canine circovirus
Canine mastadenovirus A
Canine morbillivirus
Canis familiaris polyomavirus 1
Canna yellow mottle associated virus
Canna yellow mottle virus
Canna yellow streak virus
Cannabis cryptic virus
Cano Delgadito orthohantavirus
Cao Bang orthohantavirus
Caper latent virus
Capim orthobunyavirus
Capraria yellow spot virus
Caprine alphaherpesvirus 1
Caprine arthritis encephalitis virus
Caprine gammaherpesvirus 2
Caprine respirovirus 3
Capsicum chlorosis orthotospovirus
Capsicum India alphasatellite
Capuchin monkey hepatitis B virus
Carajas vesiculovirus
Caraparu orthobunyavirus
Cardamine chlorotic fleck virus
Cardamom bushy dwarf alphasatellite
Cardamom bushy dwarf virus
Cardamom mosaic virus
Cardiochiles nigriceps bracovirus
Cardioderma cor polyomavirus 1
Cardiospermum yellow leaf curl betasatellite
Cardiovirus A
Cardiovirus B
Cardiovirus C
Cardiovirus D
Cardiovirus E
Cardiovirus F
Carey Island virus
Caribou associated gemykrogvirus 1
Carnation cryptic virus 1
Carnation etched ring virus
Carnation Italian ringspot virus
Carnation latent virus
Carnation mottle virus
Carnation necrotic fleck virus
Carnation ringspot virus
Carnation vein mottle virus
Carnivore amdoparvovirus 1
Carnivore amdoparvovirus 2
Carnivore amdoparvovirus 3
Carnivore amdoparvovirus 4
Carnivore amdoparvovirus 5
Carnivore bocaparvovirus 1
Carnivore bocaparvovirus 2
Carnivore bocaparvovirus 3
Carnivore bocaparvovirus 4
Carnivore bocaparvovirus 5
Carnivore bocaparvovirus 6
Carnivore chaphamaparvovirus 1
Carnivore protoparvovirus
Carnivore protoparvovirus 1
Carollia perspicillata polyomavirus 1
Carp sprivivirus
Carrot Ch virus 1
Carrot Ch virus 2
Carrot cryptic virus
Carrot mottle mimic virus
Carrot mottle virus
Carrot necrotic dieback virus
Carrot red leaf virus
Carrot temperate virus 1
Carrot temperate virus 2
Carrot temperate virus 3
Carrot temperate virus 4
Carrot thin leaf virus
Carrot torradovirus 1
Carrot virus Y
Carrot yellow leaf virus
Casinaria arjuna ichnovirus
Casinaria forcipata ichnovirus
Casinaria infesta ichnovirus
Cassava American latent virus
Cassava associated gemycircularvirus 1
Cassava brown streak virus
Cassava common mosaic virus
Cassava green mottle virus
Cassava mosaic Madagascar alphasatellite
Cassava mosaic Madagascar virus
Cassava vein mosaic virus
Cassava virus C
Cassava virus X
Cassia yellow blotch virus
Cat Que orthobunyavirus
Catharanthus mosaic virus
Catharanthus yellow mosaic virus
Catopsilia pomona nucleopolyhedrovirus
Catu orthobunyavirus
Caucasus prunus virus
Cauliflower mosaic virus
Caulobacter virus CcrBL10
Caulobacter virus CcrBL9
Caulobacter virus CcrColossus
Caulobacter virus CcrPW
Caulobacter virus CcrRogue
Caulobacter virus CcrSC
Caulobacter virus Lullwater
Caulobacter virus Percy
Caulobacter virus phiCbK
Caulobacter virus Sansa
Caulobacter virus Seuss
Caulobacter virus Swift
Caviid betaherpesvirus 2
Cebine betaherpesvirus 1
Cebus albifrons polyomavirus 1
Cedar henipavirus
Celery latent virus
Celery mosaic virus
Cellulophaga virus Cba121
Cellulophaga virus Cba171
Cellulophaga virus Cba172
Cellulophaga virus Cba181
Cellulophaga virus Cba41
Cellulophaga virus ST
Central chimpanzee simian foamy virus
Centropristis striata polyomavirus 1
Centrosema yellow spot virus
Ceratitis capitata Yoyo virus
Ceratobium mosaic virus
Ceratocystis resinifera virus 1
Cercopithecine alphaherpesvirus 2
Cercopithecine alphaherpesvirus 9
Cercopithecine betaherpesvirus 5
Cercopithecine gammaherpesvirus 14
Cercopithecus erythrotis polyomavirus 1
Cereal yellow dwarf virus RPS
Cereal yellow dwarf virus RPV
Cervid alphaherpesvirus 1
Cervid alphaherpesvirus 2
Cestrum yellow leaf curling virus
Cetacean morbillivirus
Chaco sripuvirus
Chaetarnavirus 2
Chaetenuissarnavirus II
Chaetoceros diatodnavirus 1
Chaetoceros protobacilladnavirus 1
Chaetoceros protobacilladnavirus 2
Chaetoceros protobacilladnavirus 3
Chaetoceros protobacilladnavirus 4
Chaetoceros socialis forma radians RNA virus 1
Chaetoceros tenuissimus RNA virus 01
Chagres phlebovirus
Chalara elegans RNA Virus 1
Chandipura vesiculovirus
Changping mivirus
Changuinola virus
Chapare mammarenavirus
Charleville sripuvirus
Charybdis mivirus
Charybdis yingvirus
Charybnivirus 1
Chayote mosaic virus
Chayote yellow mosaic virus
Chelonid alphaherpesvirus 5
Chelonid alphaherpesvirus 6
Chelonus altitudinis bracovirus
Chelonus blackburni bracovirus
Chelonus inanitus bracovirus
Chelonus insularis bracovirus
Chelonus near curvimaculatus bracovirus
Chelonus texanus bracovirus
Chenopodium leaf curl virus
Chenopodium necrosis virus
Chenuda virus
Cherry associated luteovirus
Cherry chlorotic rusty spot associated partitivirus
Cherry green ring mottle virus
Cherry leaf roll virus
Cherry mottle leaf virus
Cherry necrotic rusty mottle virus
Cherry rasp leaf virus
Cherry rusty mottle associated virus
Cherry twisted leaf associated virus
Cherry virus A
Chevrier mammarenavirus
Chick syncytial virus
Chickadee associated gemycircularvirus 1
Chicken anemia virus
Chicken associated cyclovirus 1
Chicken associated cyclovirus 2
Chicken associated gemycircularvirus 1
Chicken associated gemycircularvirus 2
Chicken associated huchismacovirus 1
Chicken associated huchismacovirus 2
Chickpea chlorosis Australia virus
Chickpea chlorosis virus
Chickpea chlorotic dwarf virus
Chickpea chlorotic stunt virus
Chickpea redleaf virus
Chickpea stunt disease associated virus
Chickpea yellow dwarf virus
Chickpea yellows virus
Chicory yellow mottle virus
Chikungunya virus
Chili leaf curl betasatellite
Chili leaf curl Jaunpur betasatellite
Chili leaf curl Sri Lanka betasatellite
Chilibre pacuvirus
Chilli leaf curl Ahmedabad virus
Chilli leaf curl alphasatellite
Chilli leaf curl Bhavanisagar virus
Chilli leaf curl Gonda virus
Chilli leaf curl India virus
Chilli leaf curl Kanpur virus
Chilli leaf curl Sri Lanka virus
Chilli leaf curl Vellanad virus
Chilli leaf curl virus
Chilli ringspot virus
Chilli veinal mottle virus
Chiltepin yellow mosaic virus
Chim orthonairovirus
Chimpanzee associated circovirus 1
Chimpanzee associated cyclovirus 1
Chimpanzee associated porprismacovirus 1
Chimpanzee associated porprismacovirus 2
China Rattus coronavirus HKU24
Chinese artichoke mosaic virus
Chinese shrew hepatitis B virus
Chinese wheat mosaic virus
Chinese yam necrotic mosaic virus
Chino del tomate Amazonas virus
Chino del tomate virus
Chinook salmon nidovirus 1
Chinturpovirus 1
Chipapillomavirus 1
Chipapillomavirus 2
Chipapillomavirus 3
Chironomus attenuatus entomopoxvirus
Chironomus luridus entomopoxvirus
Chironomus plumosus entomopoxvirus
Chironomus riparius virus 1
Chiropteran artiparvovirus 1
Chiropteran bocaparvovirus 1
Chiropteran bocaparvovirus 2
Chiropteran bocaparvovirus 3
Chiropteran bocaparvovirus 4
Chiropteran chaphamaparvovirus 1
Chiropteran dependoparvovirus 1
Chiropteran protoparvovirus 1
Chiropteran tetraparvovirus 1
Chlamydia virus Chp1
Chlamydia virus Chp2
Chlamydia virus CPAR39
Chlamydia virus CPG1
Chloris striate mosaic virus
Chlorocebus pygerythrus polyomavirus 1
Chlorocebus pygerythrus polyomavirus 2
Chlorocebus pygerythrus polyomavirus 3
Chobar Gorge virus
Choclo orthohantavirus
Chocolate lily virus A
Chondrostereum purpureum cryptic virus 1
Choristoneura biennis entomopoxvirus
Choristoneura conflicta entomopoxvirus
Choristoneura diversuma entomopoxvirus
Choristoneura fumiferana DEF multiple nucleopolyhedrovirus
Choristoneura fumiferana entomopoxvirus
Choristoneura fumiferana granulovirus
Choristoneura fumiferana multiple nucleopolyhedrovirus
Choristoneura murinana nucleopolyhedrovirus
Choristoneura rosaceana entomopoxvirus
Choristoneura rosaceana nucleopolyhedrovirus
Chorizagrotis auxiliaris entomopoxvirus
Chosvirus KM23C739
Chrysanthemum chlorotic mottle viroid
Chrysanthemum stem necrosis orthotospovirus
Chrysanthemum stunt viroid
Chrysanthemum virus B
Chrysochromulina brevifilum virus PW1
Chrysodeixis chalcites nucleopolyhedrovirus
Chrysodeixis includens nucleopolyhedrovirus
Citrobacter CrRp3
Citrobacter virus CF1
Citrobacter virus CFP1
Citrobacter virus CR44b
Citrobacter virus CR8
Citrobacter virus DK2017
Citrobacter virus Merlin
Citrobacter virus Moogle
Citrobacter virus Moon
Citrobacter virus Mordin
Citrobacter virus Sazh
Citrobacter virus SH1
Citrobacter virus SH2
Citrobacter virus SH3
Citrobacter virus SH4
Citrobacter virus Stevie
Citrus bark cracking viroid
Citrus bent leaf viroid
Citrus chlorotic dwarf associated virus
Citrus chlorotic spot dichorhavirus
Citrus coguvirus
Citrus dwarfing viroid
Citrus exocortis viroid
Citrus leaf blotch virus
Citrus leaf rugose virus
Citrus leprosis N dichorhavirus
Citrus leprosis virus C
Citrus leprosis virus C2
Citrus psorosis ophiovirus
Citrus sudden death-associated virus
Citrus tristeza virus
Citrus variegation virus
Citrus vein enation virus
Citrus viroid V
Citrus viroid VI
Citrus yellow mosaic virus
Citrus yellow vein clearing virus
Civet circovirus
Cladosporium cladosporioides polymycovirus 1
Cladosporium fulvum T-1 virus
Clanis bilineata nucleopolyhedrovirus
Clavibacter virus CMP1
Clavibacter virus CN1A
Clematis chlorotic mottle virus
Cleome golden mosaic virus
Cleome leaf crumple alphasatellite
Cleome leaf crumple virus
Clerodendron golden mosaic virus
Clerodendron yellow mosaic virus
Clerodendrum chlorotic spot dichorhavirus
Clerodendrum golden mosaic China virus
Clerodendrum golden mosaic Jiangsu virus
Clitoria virus Y
Clitoria yellow mottle virus
Clitoria yellow vein virus
Clostera anachoreta granulovirus
Clostera anastomosis granulovirus A
Clostera anastomosis granulovirus B
Clostridium virus phiC2
Clostridium virus phiCD119
Clostridium virus phiCD27
Clover yellow mosaic virus
Clover yellow vein virus
Cluster bean alphaendornavirus 1
Cnaphalocrocis medinalis granulovirus
Cnidoscolus mosaic leaf deformation virus
Coastal Plains tibrovirus
Cocal vesiculovirus
Coccinia mosaic Tamil Nadu virus
Coccinia mottle virus
Cockroach associated cyclovirus 1
Cockroach mivirus
Cocksfoot mild mosaic virus
Cocksfoot mottle virus
Cocksfoot streak virus
Cocle phlebovirus
Cocoa necrosis virus
Coconut cadang-cadang viroid
Coconut foliar decay alphasatellite
Coconut foliar decay virus
Coconut tinangaja viroid
Codonopsis vein clearing virus
Coffee ringspot dichorhavirus
Coguvirus eburi
Cole latent virus
Coleus blumei viroid 1
Coleus blumei viroid 2
Coleus blumei viroid 3
Coleus vein necrosis virus
Colletotrichum camelliae polymycovirus 1
Colletotrichum fructicola chrysovirus 1
Colletotrichum gloeosporioides chrysovirus
Colocasia bobone disease-associated cytorhabdovirus
Colombian datura virus
Colombian potato soil-borne virus
Colorado tick fever coltivirus
Columbid alphaherpesvirus 1
Columnea latent viroid
Colwellia virus 9A
Commelina mosaic virus
Commelina yellow mottle virus
Common bean mottle virus
Common bean severe mosaic virus
Common midwife toad virus
Common moorhen coronavirus HKU21
Common reed chlorotic stripe virus
Condylorrhiza vestigialis nucleopolyhedrovirus
Coniothyrium minitans RNA virus
Connecticut sawgrhavirus
Coot Bay almendravirus
Corchorus golden mosaic virus
Corchorus yellow spot virus
Corchorus yellow vein mosaic virus
Corchorus yellow vein virus
Cordyline virus 1
Cordyline virus 2
Cordyline virus 3
Cordyline virus 4
Coronavirus HKU15
Corriparta virus
Corvus monedula polyomavirus 1
Corynebacterium virus BFK20
Corynebacterium virus C3PO
Corynebacterium virus Darwin
Corynebacterium virus Juicebox
Corynebacterium virus P1201
Corynebacterium virus phi673
Corynebacterium virus phi674
Corynebacterium virus Poushou
Corynebacterium virus SamW
Corynebacterium virus Zion
Cosavirus A
Cosavirus B
Cosavirus D
Cosavirus E
Cosavirus F
Cotesia congregata bracovirus
Cotesia flavipes bracovirus
Cotesia glomerata bracovirus
Cotesia hyphantriae bracovirus
Cotesia kariyai bracovirus
Cotesia marginiventris bracovirus
Cotesia melanoscela bracovirus
Cotesia rubecula bracovirus
Cotesia schaeferi bracovirus
Cotia virus
Cotton chlorotic spot virus
Cotton leaf crumple virus
Cotton leaf curl Alabad virus
Cotton leaf curl Bangalore virus
Cotton leaf curl Barasat virus
Cotton leaf curl Egypt alphasatellite
Cotton leaf curl Gezira alphasatellite
Cotton leaf curl Gezira betasatellite
Cotton leaf curl Gezira virus
Cotton leaf curl Kokhran virus
Cotton leaf curl Lucknow alphasatellite
Cotton leaf curl Multan alphasatellite
Cotton leaf curl Multan betasatellite
Cotton leaf curl Multan virus
Cotton leaf curl Saudi Arabia alphasatellite
Cotton leafroll dwarf virus
Cotton yellow mosaic virus
Cow vetch latent alphasatellite
Cowbone Ridge virus
Cowpea aphid-borne mosaic virus
Cowpea bright yellow mosaic virus
Cowpea chlorotic mottle virus
Cowpea golden mosaic virus
Cowpea mild mottle virus
Cowpea mosaic virus
Cowpea mottle virus
Cowpea severe mosaic virus
Cowpox virus
Crab mivirus
Cracticus torquatus polyomavirus 1
Crahelivirus A
Crassocephalum yellow vein virus
Cricetid gammaherpesvirus 2
Cricket paralysis virus
Crimean-Congo hemorrhagic fever orthonairovirus
Crimson clover cryptic virus 2
Crimson clover latent virus
Crohivirus A
Crohivirus B
Cronobacter virus CR3
Cronobacter virus CR8
Cronobacter virus CR9
Cronobacter virus Dev2
Cronobacter virus DevCD23823
Cronobacter virus Esp2949-1
Cronobacter virus ESSI2
Cronobacter virus GAP227
Cronobacter virus GAP31
Cronobacter virus GAP32
Cronobacter virus GW1
Cronobacter virus PBES02
Cronobacter virus PhiCS01
Croton golden mosaic virus
Croton yellow vein deltasatellite
Croton yellow vein mosaic alphasatellite
Croton yellow vein mosaic betasatellite
Croton yellow vein mosaic virus
Crustacean lincruvirus
Crustacean mivirus
Cryphonectria hypovirus 1
Cryphonectria hypovirus 2
Cryphonectria hypovirus 3
Cryphonectria hypovirus 4
Cryphonectria mitovirus 1
Cryphonectria nitschkei chrysovirus 1
Cryptophlebia leucotreta granulovirus
Cryptophlebia peltastica nucleopolyhedrovirus
Cryptosporidium parvum virus 1
Cucumber Bulgarian latent virus
Cucumber fruit mottle mosaic virus
Cucumber green mottle mosaic virus
Cucumber leaf spot virus
Cucumber mosaic virus
Cucumber mottle virus
Cucumber necrosis virus
Cucumber soil-borne virus
Cucumber vein yellowing virus
Cucumber vein-clearing virus
Cucumis melo alphaendornavirus
Cucurbit aphid-borne yellows virus
Cucurbit leaf crumple virus
Cucurbit mild mosaic virus
Cucurbit vein banding virus
Cucurbit yellow stunting disorder virus
Cuiaba sripuvirus
Culex nigripalpus nucleopolyhedrovirus
Culex ohlsrhavirus
Culex orthophasmavirus
Cumuto goukovirus
Cupixi mammarenavirus
Curionopolis curiovirus
Currant latent virus
Currant virus A
Curvibacter virus P26059B
Cycas necrotic stunt virus
Cyclophragma undans nucleopolyhedrovirus
Cydia pomonella granulovirus
Cymbidium chlorotic mosaic virus
Cymbidium mosaic virus
Cymbidium ringspot virus
Cynoglossus cynoglossusvirus
Cynomolgus macaque simian foamy virus
Cypovirus 1
Cypovirus 10
Cypovirus 11
Cypovirus 12
Cypovirus 13
Cypovirus 14
Cypovirus 15
Cypovirus 16
Cypovirus 2
Cypovirus 3
Cypovirus 4
Cypovirus 5
Cypovirus 6
Cypovirus 7
Cypovirus 8
Cypovirus 9
Cyprinid herpesvirus 1
Cyprinid herpesvirus 2
Cyprinid herpesvirus 3
Cypripedium virus Y
Cyrtanthus elatus virus A

D

Dabie bandavirus
Dabieshan orthohantavirus
Dabieshan uukuvirus
Dadou sclerotimonavirus
Dahlia latent viroid
Dahlia mosaic virus
Dakar bat virus
Dalechampia chlorotic mosaic virus
Dandelion yellow mosaic virus
Daphne mosaic virus
Daphne virus S
Daphne virus Y
Darna trima virus
Dasheen mosaic virus
Dashli phlebovirus
Dasychira pudibunda virus
Datura leaf curl virus
Datura leaf distortion virus
Datura shoestring virus
Datura yellow vein betanucleorhabdovirus
Decapod aquambidensovirus 1
Decapod hepanhamaparvovirus 1
Decapod iridescent virus 1
Decapod penstylhamaparvovirus 1
Decronivirus 1
Deer atadenovirus A
Deer mastadenovirus B
Deformed wing virus
Deinbollia mosaic virus
Delftia virus IMEDE1
Delftia virus PhiW14
Delphinus delphis polyomavirus 1
Deltaarterivirus hemfev
Deltalipothrixvirus SBFV3
Deltapapillomavirus 1
Deltapapillomavirus 2
Deltapapillomavirus 3
Deltapapillomavirus 4
Deltapapillomavirus 5
Deltapapillomavirus 6
Deltapapillomavirus 7
Demodema bonariensis entomopoxvirus
Dendrobium chlorotic mosaic virus
Dendrolimus punctatus virus
Dengue virus
Dera Ghazi Khan orthonairovirus
Dermacentor mivirus
Dermolepida albohirtum entomopoxvirus
Desmodium leaf distortion virus
Desmodium mottle virus
Desmodium yellow mottle virus
Desmodus rotundus polyomavirus 1
Dhori thogotovirus
Diachasmimorpha entomopoxvirus
Diadegma acronyctae ichnovirus
Diadegma interruptum ichnovirus
Diadegma terebrans ichnovirus
Diadromus pulchellus toursvirus
Diatraea saccharalis granulovirus
Dickeya virus AD1
Dickeya virus BF25-12
Dickeya virus Dagda
Dickeya virus JA10
Dickeya virus JA11
Dickeya virus JA29
Dickeya virus Katbat
Dickeya virus Limestone
Dickeya virus Luksen
Dickeya virus Mysterion
Dickeya virus Ninurta
Dickeya virus RC2014
Dicliptera yellow mottle Cuba virus
Dicliptera yellow mottle virus
Dictyostelium discoideum Skipper virus
Digitaria ciliaris striate mosaic virus
Digitaria didactyla striate mosaic virus
Digitaria streak virus
Dill cryptic virus 2
Dinocampus coccinellae paralysis virus
Dinoroseobacter virus D5C
Dinoroseobacter virus DFL12
Diodia vein chlorosis virus
Diolcogaster facetosa bracovirus
Dioscorea bacilliform AL virus
Dioscorea bacilliform AL virus 2
Dioscorea bacilliform ES virus
Dioscorea bacilliform RT virus 1
Dioscorea bacilliform RT virus 2
Dioscorea bacilliform SN virus
Dioscorea bacilliform TR virus
Dioscorea mosaic associated virus
Dioscorea mosaic virus
Dioscorea nummularia associated virus
Dipteran anphevirus
Dipteran beidivirus
Dipteran brevihamaparvovirus 1
Dipteran brevihamaparvovirus 2
Dipteran hudivirus
Dipteran phasivirus
Dipteran protoambidensovirus 1
Diresapivirus A
Diresapivirus B
Discula destructiva virus 1
Discula destructiva virus 2
Diuris virus A
Diuris virus B
Diuris virus Y
Dobrava-Belgrade orthohantavirus
Dobsonia moluccensis polyomavirus 1
Dobsonia moluccensis polyomavirus 2
Dobsonia moluccensis polyomavirus 3
Dolichos yellow mosaic virus
Dolphin mastadenovirus A
Dolphin mastadenovirus B
Domestic cat hepatitis B virus
Donkey orchid symptomless virus
Donkey orchid virus A
Dragonfly associated alphasatellite
Dragonfly associated bovismacovirus 1
Dragonfly associated cyclovirus 1
Dragonfly associated cyclovirus 2
Dragonfly associated cyclovirus 3
Dragonfly associated cyclovirus 4
Dragonfly associated cyclovirus 5
Dragonfly associated cyclovirus 6
Dragonfly associated cyclovirus 7
Dragonfly associated cyclovirus 8
Dragonfly associated dragsmacovirus 1
Dragonfly associated gemycircularvirus 1
Dragonfly associated gemyduguivirus 1
Dragonfly associated gemykibivirus 1
Dragonfly-associated mastrevirus
Drakaea virus A
Drop sclerotimonavirus
Drosophila affinis sigmavirus
Drosophila ananassae sigmavirus
Drosophila ananassae Tom virus
Drosophila buzzatii Osvaldo virus
Drosophila C virus
Drosophila immigrans sigmavirus
Drosophila melanogaster 17-6 virus
Drosophila melanogaster 1731 virus
Drosophila melanogaster 297 virus
Drosophila melanogaster 412 virus
Drosophila melanogaster Bel virus
Drosophila melanogaster Blastopia virus
Drosophila melanogaster copia virus
Drosophila melanogaster Gypsy virus
Drosophila melanogaster Idefix virus
Drosophila melanogaster Mdg1 virus
Drosophila melanogaster Mdg3 virus
Drosophila melanogaster Micropia virus
Drosophila melanogaster Roo virus
Drosophila melanogaster sigmavirus
Drosophila melanogaster Tirant virus
Drosophila melanogaster Zam virus
Drosophila obscura sigmavirus
Drosophila semotivirus Max
Drosophila simulans Ninja virus
Drosophila tristis sigmavirus
Drosophila virilis Tv1 virus
Drosophila virilis Ulysses virus
Drosophila X virus
Drosophilid anphevirus
Drosophina B birnavirus
Duck associated cyclovirus 1
Duck atadenovirus A
Duck aviadenovirus B
Duck circovirus
Duck coronavirus 2714
Duck hepatitis B virus
Dugbe orthonairovirus
Dulcamara mottle virus
Durania phlebovirus
Duranta leaf curl virus
Durham tupavirus
Duvenhage lyssavirus
Dyochipapillomavirus 1
Dyodeltapapillomavirus 1
Dyoepsilonpapillomavirus 1
Dyoetapapillomavirus 1
Dyoiotapapillomavirus 1
Dyoiotapapillomavirus 2
Dyokappapapillomavirus 1
Dyokappapapillomavirus 2
Dyokappapapillomavirus 3
Dyokappapapillomavirus 4
Dyokappapapillomavirus 5
Dyolambdapapillomavirus 1
Dyomupapillomavirus 1
Dyonupapillomavirus 1
Dyoomegapapillomavirus 1
Dyoomikronpapillomavirus 1
Dyophipapillomavirus 1
Dyopipapillomavirus 1
Dyopsipapillomavirus 1
Dyorhopapillomavirus 1
Dyosigmapapillomavirus 1
Dyotaupapillomavirus 1
Dyothetapapillomavirus 1
Dyoupsilonpapillomavirus 1
Dyoxipapillomavirus 1
Dyoxipapillomavirus 2
Dyozetapapillomavirus 1

E

East African cassava mosaic Cameroon virus
East African cassava mosaic Kenya virus
East African cassava mosaic Malawi virus
East African cassava mosaic virus
East African cassava mosaic Zanzibar virus
East Asian Passiflora distortion virus
East Asian Passiflora virus
Eastern chimpanzee simian foamy virus
Eastern equine encephalitis virus
Eastern kangaroopox virus
Echarate phlebovirus
Echinochloa hoja blanca tenuivirus
Echinochloa ragged stunt virus
Echinoderm berhavirus
Eclipta yellow vein alphasatellite
Eclipta yellow vein virus
Ectocarpus fasciculatus virus a
Ectocarpus siliculosus virus 1
Ectocarpus siliculosus virus a
Ectromelia virus
Ectropis obliqua nucleopolyhedrovirus
Ectropis obliqua virus
Edge Hill virus
Edwardsiella virus eiAU
Edwardsiella virus GF2
Edwardsiella virus KF1
Edwardsiella virus MSW3
Edwardsiella virus PEi21
Edwardsiella virus pEtSU
Eggerthella virus PMBT5
Eggplant latent viroid
Eggplant mosaic virus
Eggplant mottled crinkle virus
Eggplant mottled dwarf alphanucleorhabdovirus
Eidolon bat coronavirus C704
Eidolon helvum polyomavirus 1
Eilat virus
Ekpoma 1 tibrovirus
Ekpoma 2 tibrovirus
El Moro Canyon orthohantavirus
Elapid 1 orthobornavirus
Elderberry latent virus
Elephantid betaherpesvirus 1
Elephantid betaherpesvirus 4
Elephantid betaherpesvirus 5
Elm mottle virus
Emilia yellow vein Fujian virus
Emilia yellow vein Thailand virus
Emilia yellow vein virus
Emiliania huxleyi virus 86
Endive necrotic mosaic virus
Enhydra lutris polyomavirus 1
Enseada orthobunyavirus
Entebbe bat virus
Enterobacter virus E2
Enterobacter virus E3
Enterobacter virus Eap1
Enterobacter virus Eap3
Enterobacter virus EcL1
Enterobacter virus EcpYZU01
Enterobacter virus F20
Enterobacter virus KDA1
Enterobacter virus KPN3
Enterobacter virus PG7
Enterobacteria virus IME390
Enterobacteria virus T7M
Enterococcus virus AL2
Enterococcus virus AL3
Enterococcus virus AUEF3
Enterococcus virus BC611
Enterococcus virus ECP3
Enterococcus virus EcZZ2
Enterococcus virus EF24C
Enterococcus virus EF3
Enterococcus virus EF4
Enterococcus virus EfaCPT1
Enterococcus virus EFDG1
Enterococcus virus EFLK1
Enterococcus virus EFP01
Enterococcus virus EfV12
Enterococcus virus FL1
Enterococcus virus FL2
Enterococcus virus FL3
Enterococcus virus IME196
Enterococcus virus IMEEF1
Enterococcus virus LY0322
Enterococcus virus phiSHEF2
Enterococcus virus phiSHEF4
Enterococcus virus phiSHEF5
Enterococcus virus PMBT2
Enterococcus virus SANTOR1
Enterococcus virus SAP6
Enterococcus virus VD13
Enterovirus A
Enterovirus B
Enterovirus C
Enterovirus D
Enterovirus E
Enterovirus F
Enterovirus G
Enterovirus H
Enterovirus I
Enterovirus J
Enterovirus K
Enterovirus L
Entoleuca entovirus
Enytus montanus ichnovirus
Epichloe festucae virus 1
Epinotia aporema granulovirus
Epiphyas postvittana nucleopolyhedrovirus
Epirus cherry virus
Epizootic haematopoietic necrosis virus
Epizootic hemorrhagic disease virus
Epsilonarterivirus hemcep
Epsilonarterivirus safriver
Epsilonarterivirus zamalb
Epsilonpapillomavirus 1
Epsilonpapillomavirus 2
Eptesipox virus
Equid alphaherpesvirus 1
Equid alphaherpesvirus 3
Equid alphaherpesvirus 4
Equid alphaherpesvirus 8
Equid alphaherpesvirus 9
Equid gammaherpesvirus 2
Equid gammaherpesvirus 5
Equid gammaherpesvirus 7
Equine associated gemycircularvirus 1
Equine encephalosis virus
Equine foamy virus
Equine infectious anemia virus
Equine mastadenovirus A
Equine mastadenovirus B
Equine picobirnavirus
Equine rhinitis A virus
Equine torovirus
Equus caballus polyomavirus 1
Eragrostis curvula streak virus
Eragrostis minor streak virus
Eragrostis streak virus
Erbovirus A
Erectites yellow mosaic virus
Eriborus terebrans ichnovirus
Erinnyis ello granulovirus
Eriocheir sinensis reovirus
Erwinia virus Alexandra
Erwinia virus Asesino
Erwinia virus Deimos
Erwinia virus Derbicus
Erwinia virus Desertfox
Erwinia virus Ea214
Erwinia virus Ea2809
Erwinia virus Ea35-70
Erwinia virus Ea9-2
Erwinia virus EaH1
Erwinia virus EaH2
Erwinia virus Eho49
Erwinia virus Eho59
Erwinia virus ENT90
Erwinia virus Era103
Erwinia virus EtG
Erwinia virus Faunus
Erwinia virus FE44
Erwinia virus Frozen
Erwinia virus L1
Erwinia virus M7
Erwinia virus Machina
Erwinia virus RAY
Erwinia virus Risingsun
Erwinia virus S2
Erwinia virus Simmy50
Erwinia virus SpecialG
Erwinia virus Wellington
Erwinia virus Y2
Erwinia virus Y3
Erwinia virus Yoloswag
Erysimum latent virus
Erysiphe cichoracearum alphaendornavirus
Erythrura gouldiae polyomavirus 1
Escherchia virus LL11
Escherichia phage ESCO13
Escherichia virus 121Q
Escherichia virus 13a
Escherichia virus 172-1
Escherichia virus 186
Escherichia virus 191
Escherichia virus 24B
Escherichia virus 285P
Escherichia virus 4MG
Escherichia virus 64795ec1
Escherichia virus 933W
Escherichia virus 95
Escherichia virus 9g
Escherichia virus AAPEc6
Escherichia virus ACGC91
Escherichia virus ACGM12
Escherichia virus ADB2
Escherichia virus AHP42
Escherichia virus AHS24
Escherichia virus AKFV33
Escherichia virus AKS96
Escherichia virus Alf5
Escherichia virus alpha3
Escherichia virus APCEc01
Escherichia virus APEC5
Escherichia virus APEC7
Escherichia virus APECc02
Escherichia virus AR1
Escherichia virus Av05
Escherichia virus AYO145A
Escherichia virus B
Escherichia virus BA14
Escherichia virus BF23
Escherichia virus BIFF
Escherichia virus Bp4
Escherichia virus Bp7
Escherichia virus BZ13
Escherichia virus C
Escherichia virus C119
Escherichia virus C1302
Escherichia virus C40
Escherichia virus C5
Escherichia virus Cajan
Escherichia virus CBA120
Escherichia virus CC31
Escherichia virus CF2
Escherichia virus chee24
Escherichia virus CICC80001
Escherichia virus CVM10
Escherichia virus DE3
Escherichia virus DT5712
Escherichia virus DT57C
Escherichia virus DTL
Escherichia virus E112
Escherichia virus E41c
Escherichia virus Eb49
Escherichia virus Ebrios
Escherichia virus EC1UPM
Escherichia virus EC2
Escherichia virus EC3a
Escherichia virus EC6
Escherichia virus ECA2
Escherichia virus ECB2
Escherichia virus ECBP1
Escherichia virus ECBP5
Escherichia virus ECD7
Escherichia virus ECML-117
Escherichia virus ECML134
Escherichia virus ECML4
Escherichia virus EcoDS1
Escherichia virus ECOO78
Escherichia virus EG1
Escherichia virus EK99P1
Escherichia virus ep3
Escherichia virus EPS7
Escherichia virus ESCO41
Escherichia virus ESCO5
Escherichia virus F
Escherichia virus FEC19
Escherichia virus FFH1
Escherichia virus FFH2
Escherichia virus FI
Escherichia virus fiAA91ss
Escherichia virus FV3
Escherichia virus G4
Escherichia virus G7C
Escherichia virus GA2A
Escherichia virus GEC3S
Escherichia virus GJ1
Escherichia virus Goslar
Escherichia virus Gostya9
Escherichia virus H8
Escherichia virus HK022
Escherichia virus HK106
Escherichia virus HK446
Escherichia virus HK542
Escherichia virus HK544
Escherichia virus HK578
Escherichia virus HK620
Escherichia virus HK629
Escherichia virus HK630
Escherichia virus HK633
Escherichia virus HK75
Escherichia virus HK97
Escherichia virus HP3
Escherichia virus HX01
Escherichia virus HY01
Escherichia virus HY02
Escherichia virus HY03
Escherichia virus HZ2R8
Escherichia virus HZP2
Escherichia virus I22
Escherichia virus ID21
Escherichia virus ID32
Escherichia virus ID52
Escherichia virus ID62
Escherichia virus If1
Escherichia virus IME08
Escherichia virus Ime09
Escherichia virus IME11
Escherichia virus IME18
Escherichia virus IME253
Escherichia virus IME347
Escherichia virus IME542
Escherichia virus IMM002
Escherichia virus J8-65
Escherichia virus JenK1
Escherichia virus JenP1
Escherichia virus JenP2
Escherichia virus JES2013
Escherichia virus JH2
Escherichia virus Jk06
Escherichia virus JL1
Escherichia virus JMPW1
Escherichia virus JMPW2
Escherichia virus JS09
Escherichia virus JS10
Escherichia virus JS98
Escherichia virus JSE
Escherichia virus K
Escherichia virus K1-5
Escherichia virus K1E
Escherichia virus K1F
Escherichia virus K1G
Escherichia virus K1H
Escherichia virus K1ind1
Escherichia virus K1ind2
Escherichia virus K30
Escherichia virus KP26
Escherichia virus KWBSE43-6
Escherichia virus Lambda
Escherichia virus Lidtsur
Escherichia virus LL2
Escherichia virus LL5
Escherichia virus LM33P1
Escherichia virus M13
Escherichia virus mar001J1
Escherichia virus mar002J2
Escherichia virus mar003J3
Escherichia virus mar004NP2
Escherichia virus mEp234
Escherichia virus mEpX1
Escherichia virus mEpX2
Escherichia virus Min27
Escherichia virus Minorna
Escherichia virus MS2
Escherichia virus Mu
Escherichia virus Murica
Escherichia virus mutPK1A2
Escherichia virus MX01
Escherichia virus N15
Escherichia virus N30
Escherichia virus N4
Escherichia virus NBD2
Escherichia virus NC28
Escherichia virus NC29
Escherichia virus NC35
Escherichia virus NCA
Escherichia virus NJ01
Escherichia virus O157tp3
Escherichia virus O157tp6
Escherichia virus OSYSP
Escherichia virus P1
Escherichia virus P2
Escherichia virus P483
Escherichia virus P694
Escherichia virus P88
Escherichia virus PA2
Escherichia virus PA28
Escherichia virus PE3-1
Escherichia virus PGT2
Escherichia virus PhAPEC2
Escherichia virus phAPEC8
Escherichia virus PhaxI
Escherichia virus phi1
Escherichia virus phiAPCEc03
Escherichia virus phiEB49
Escherichia virus phiEco32
Escherichia virus phiJLA23
Escherichia virus phiK
Escherichia virus PhiKT
Escherichia virus phiLLS
Escherichia virus phiV10
Escherichia virus phiX174
Escherichia virus Pollock
Escherichia virus pro147
Escherichia virus pro483
Escherichia virus PTXU04
Escherichia virus Qbeta
Escherichia virus QL01
Escherichia virus RB14
Escherichia virus RB16
Escherichia virus RB3
Escherichia virus RB32
Escherichia virus RB43
Escherichia virus RB49
Escherichia virus RB69
Escherichia virus RCS47
Escherichia virus Ro45lw
Escherichia virus Rogue1
Escherichia virus Rtp
Escherichia virus S523
Escherichia virus saus132
Escherichia virus Schickermooser
Escherichia virus SECphi27
Escherichia virus Septima11
Escherichia virus Seurat
Escherichia virus SH2
Escherichia virus Skarpretter
Escherichia virus slur03
Escherichia virus slur04
Escherichia virus slur09
Escherichia virus slur16
Escherichia virus Sortsne
Escherichia virus SRT7
Escherichia virus SRT8
Escherichia virus SSL2009a
Escherichia virus ST0
Escherichia virus St1
Escherichia virus ST31
Escherichia virus ST32
Escherichia virus Stx2 II
Escherichia virus SU10
Escherichia virus SUSP1
Escherichia virus SUSP2
Escherichia virus swan01
Escherichia virus T1
Escherichia virus T3
Escherichia virus T3Luria
Escherichia virus T4
Escherichia virus T5
Escherichia virus T7
Escherichia virus Talmos
Escherichia virus TL2011
Escherichia virus TLS
Escherichia virus TP1
Escherichia virus UAB78
Escherichia virus V18
Escherichia virus V5
Escherichia virus Vec13
Escherichia virus VEc3
Escherichia virus VpaE1
Escherichia virus VR20
Escherichia virus VR25
Escherichia virus VR26
Escherichia virus VR5
Escherichia virus VR7
Escherichia virus WA45
Escherichia virus WFC
Escherichia virus WFH
Escherichia virus WG01
Escherichia virus Wphi
Escherichia virus wV8
Escherichia virus YD2008s
Escherichia virus YZ1
Escherichia virus ZG49
Eschierichia virus PBECO4
Esherichia virus Golestan
Estero Real orthonairovirus
Etaarterivirus ugarco 1
Etapapillomavirus 1
Ethiopian tobacco bushy top virus
Eubenangee virus
Eulipotyphla protoparvovirus 1
Eupatorium yellow vein betasatellite
Eupatorium yellow vein mosaic betasatellite
Eupatorium yellow vein mosaic virus
Eupatorium yellow vein virus
Euphorbia caput-medusae latent virus
Euphorbia leaf curl Guangxi virus
Euphorbia leaf curl virus
Euphorbia mosaic Peru virus
Euphorbia mosaic virus
Euphorbia ringspot virus
Euphorbia yellow leaf curl virus
Euphorbia yellow mosaic alphasatellite
Euphorbia yellow mosaic virus
Euproctis pseudoconspersa nucleopolyhedrovirus
Euprosterna elaeasa virus
European bat 1 lyssavirus
European bat 2 lyssavirus
European brown hare syndrome virus
European catfish circovirus
European mountain ash ringspot-associated emaravirus
Everglades virus
Exomis microphylla latent virus
Eyach coltivirus

F

Faba bean necrotic stunt alphasatellite
Faba bean necrotic stunt virus
Faba bean necrotic yellows alphasatellite 1
Faba bean necrotic yellows alphasatellite 2
Faba bean necrotic yellows alphasatellite 3
Faba bean necrotic yellows virus
Faba bean polerovirus 1
Faba bean yellow leaf virus
Faceys paddock orthobunyavirus
Faecalibacterium virus Brigit
Faecalibacterium virus Epona
Faecalibacterium virus Lagaffe
Faecalibacterium virus Lugh
Faecalibacterium virus Mushu
Faecalibacterium virus Oengus
Faecalibacterium virus Taranis
Faecalibacterium virus Toutatis
Falcon aviadenovirus A
Fathead minnow nidovirus 1
Feldmannia irregularis virus a
Feldmannia species virus
Feldmannia species virus a
Felid alphaherpesvirus 1
Felid gammaherpesvirus 1
Feline associated cyclovirus 1
Feline calicivirus
Feline foamy virus
Feline immunodeficiency virus
Feline leukemia virus
Feline morbillivirus
Felipivirus A
Ferak feravirus
Festuca leaf streak cytorhabdovirus
Fig badnavirus 1
Fig cryptic virus
Fig mosaic emaravirus
Figulus sublaevis entomopoxvirus
Figwort mosaic virus
Fiji disease virus
Fikirini ledantevirus
Finch circovirus
Finkel-Biskis-Jinkins murine sarcoma virus
Fipivirus A
Fipivirus B
Fipivirus C
Fipivirus D
Fipivirus E
Flamingopox virus
Flammulina velutipes browning virus
Flanders hapavirus
Flavobacterium virus 1H
Flavobacterium virus 23T
Flavobacterium virus 2A
Flavobacterium virus 6H
Flavobacterium virus FCL2
Flavobacterium virus FCV1
Flavobacterium virus FLiP
Flavobacterium virus Fpv1
Flavobacterium virus Fpv4
Flexal mammarenavirus
Flock House virus
Fly phasivirus
Foot-and-mouth disease virus
Formica exsecta virus 3
Fort Morgan virus
Fort Sherman orthobunyavirus
Foussvirus S46C10
Fowl aviadenovirus A
Fowl aviadenovirus B
Fowl aviadenovirus C
Fowl aviadenovirus D
Fowl aviadenovirus E
Fowlpox virus
Foxtail mosaic virus
Fragaria chiloensis latent virus
Frangipani mosaic virus
Freesia mosaic virus
Freesia sneak ophiovirus
French bean leaf curl betasatellite
French bean leaf curl virus
French bean severe leaf curl virus
Frijoles phlebovirus
Fritillary virus Y
Frog siadenovirus A
Frog virus 3
Fugong orthohantavirus
Fujinami sarcoma virus
Fukuoka ledantevirus
Fur seal associated gemycircularvirus 1
Furcraea necrotic streak virus
Fusarium deltaflexivirus 1
Fusarium graminearum chrysovirus
Fusarium oxysporum chrysovirus 1
Fusarium oxysporum chrysovirus 2
Fusarium oxysporum Skippy virus
Fusarium poae virus 1
Fusarium redolens polymycovirus 1
Fusarium solani virus 1
Fusong orthohantavirus
Fussvirus S30C28

G

Gabek phlebovirus
Gadgets Gully virus
Gaeumannomyces graminis virus 0196A
Gaeumannomyces graminis virus T1A
Gaillardia latent virus
Gairo mammarenavirus
Galinsoga mosaic virus
Gallid alphaherpesvirus 1
Gallid alphaherpesvirus 2
Gallid alphaherpesvirus 3
Galliform aveparvovirus 1
Galliform chaphamaparvovirus 1
Galliform chaphamaparvovirus 2
Galliform chaphamaparvovirus 3
Gallivirus A
Gamboa orthobunyavirus
Gammaarterivirus lacdeh
Gammapapillomavirus 1
Gammapapillomavirus 10
Gammapapillomavirus 11
Gammapapillomavirus 12
Gammapapillomavirus 13
Gammapapillomavirus 14
Gammapapillomavirus 15
Gammapapillomavirus 16
Gammapapillomavirus 17
Gammapapillomavirus 18
Gammapapillomavirus 19
Gammapapillomavirus 2
Gammapapillomavirus 20
Gammapapillomavirus 21
Gammapapillomavirus 22
Gammapapillomavirus 23
Gammapapillomavirus 24
Gammapapillomavirus 25
Gammapapillomavirus 26
Gammapapillomavirus 27
Gammapapillomavirus 3
Gammapapillomavirus 4
Gammapapillomavirus 5
Gammapapillomavirus 6
Gammapapillomavirus 7
Gammapapillomavirus 8
Gammapapillomavirus 9
Gammapleolipovirus His2
Ganda orthophasmavirus
Gannoruwa bat lyssavirus
Garba sunrhavirus
Gardner-Arnstein feline sarcoma virus
Garlic common latent virus
Garlic dwarf virus
Garlic mite-borne filamentous virus
Garlic virus A
Garlic virus B
Garlic virus C
Garlic virus D
Garlic virus E
Garlic virus X
Gayfeather mild mottle virus
Gecko reptillovirus
Gentian mosaic virus
Gentian ovary ringspot virus
Geobacillus virus GBSV1
Geobacillus virus Tp84
Geotrupes sylvaticus entomopoxvirus
Gerrid arlivirus
Gerygone associated gemycircularvirus 1
Gerygone associated gemycircularvirus 2
Gerygone associated gemycircularvirus 3
Getah virus
Ghanaian bat henipavirus
Giardia lamblia virus
Gibbon ape leukemia virus
Giessen reptarenavirus
Gill-associated virus
Gloriosa stripe mosaic virus
Glossina hytrosavirus
Gluconobacter virus GC1
Glycine max SIRE1 virus
Glycine max Tgmr virus
Glycine mosaic virus
Glycine sclerotimonavirus
Glypta fumiferanae ichnovirus
Glyptapanteles flavicoxis bracovirus
Glyptapanteles indiensis bracovirus
Glyptapanteles liparidis bracovirus
Goat associated cyclovirus 1
Goatpox virus
Goeldichironomus holoprasinus entomopoxvirus
Golden reptarenavirus
Gomphocarpus mosaic virus
Goose aviadenovirus A
Goose circovirus
Goose coronavirus CB17
Gooseberry vein banding associated virus
Goosefish actinovirus
Gordil phlebovirus
Gordinia virus Birksandsocks
Gordonia virus Apricot
Gordonia virus Asapag
Gordonia virus Attis
Gordonia virus Bachita
Gordonia virus Bantam
Gordonia virus BaxterFox
Gordonia virus BENtherdunthat
Gordonia virus BetterKatz
Gordonia virus Billnye
Gordonia virus Bowser
Gordonia virus Brandonk123
Gordonia virus Britbrat
Gordonia virus BrutonGaster
Gordonia virus ClubL
Gordonia virus Cozz
Gordonia virus DareDevil
Gordonia virus Demosthenes
Gordonia virus Emalyn
Gordonia virus Eyre
Gordonia virus Fairfaxidumvirus
Gordonia virus Flakey
Gordonia virus Fryberger
Gordonia virus GAL1
Gordonia virus Getalong
Gordonia virus Ghobes
Gordonia virus GMA3
Gordonia virus GMA6
Gordonia virus GMA7
Gordonia virus GodonK
Gordonia virus GordTnk2
Gordonia virus Gsput1
Gordonia virus GTE2
Gordonia virus GTE7
Gordonia virus Gustav
Gordonia virus Hedwig
Gordonia virus Horus
Gordonia virus Hotorobo
Gordonia virus Jace
Gordonia virus Jumbo
Gordonia virus Katyusha
Gordonia virus Kenna
Gordonia virus Kita
Gordonia virus Kvothe
Gordonia virus Lennon
Gordonia virus Lucky10
Gordonia virus Mahdia
Gordonia virus Monty
Gordonia virus Nyceirae
Gordonia virus Nymphadora
Gordonia virus OneUp
Gordonia virus Orchid
Gordonia virus Phistory
Gordonia virus Ronaldo
Gordonia virus Ruthy
Gordonia virus Schnabeltier
Gordonia virus Smoothie
Gordonia virus Soups
Gordonia virus Sour
Gordonia virus Stevefrench
Gordonia virus Strosahl
Gordonia virus Suzy
Gordonia virus Terapin
Gordonia virus Trine
Gordonia virus Troje
Gordonia virus Twister6
Gordonia virus Vendetta
Gordonia virus Vivi2
Gordonia virus Wait
Gordonia virus Wizard
Gordonia virus Woes
Gordonia virus Yeezy
Gordonia virus Yvonnetastic
Gordonia virus Zirinka
Gorilla associated porprismacovirus 1
Gorilla gorilla polyomavirus 1
Gorilline gammaherpesvirus 1
Gossypium darwinii symptomless alphasatellite
Gossypium mustelinum symptomless alphasatellite
Gouleako goukovirus
Grand Arbaud uukuvirus
Grapevine Algerian latent virus
Grapevine Anatolian ringspot virus
Grapevine asteroid mosaic associated virus
Grapevine badnavirus 1
Grapevine berry inner necrosis virus
Grapevine Bulgarian latent virus
Grapevine chrome mosaic virus
Grapevine deformation virus
Grapevine enamovirus 1
Grapevine endophyte alphaendornavirus
Grapevine fabavirus
Grapevine fanleaf virus
Grapevine fleck virus
Grapevine leafroll-associated virus 1
Grapevine leafroll-associated virus 13
Grapevine leafroll-associated virus 2
Grapevine leafroll-associated virus 3
Grapevine leafroll-associated virus 4
Grapevine leafroll-associated virus 7
Grapevine Pinot gris virus
Grapevine red blotch virus
Grapevine Roditis leaf discoloration-associated virus
Grapevine rupestris stem pitting-associated virus
Grapevine Syrah virus 1
Grapevine Tunisian ringspot virus
Grapevine vein clearing virus
Grapevine virus A
Grapevine virus B
Grapevine virus D
Grapevine virus E
Grapevine virus F
Grapevine virus G
Grapevine virus H
Grapevine virus I
Grapevine virus J
Grapevine virus T
Grapevine yellow speckle viroid 1
Grapevine yellow speckle viroid 2
Gray Lodge hapavirus
Great Island virus
Great tit siadenovirus A
Gremmeniella abietina betaendornavirus 1
Gremmeniella abietina RNA virus L1
Gremmeniella abietina RNA virus MS1
Grey sealpox virus
Grivet simian foamy virus
Ground squirrel hepatitis virus
Groundnut bud necrosis orthotospovirus
Groundnut chlorotic fan spot orthotospovirus
Groundnut ringspot orthotospovirus
Groundnut rosette assistor virus
Groundnut rosette virus
Groundnut yellow spot orthotospovirus
Gruhelivirus A
Gruiform aveparvovirus 1
Grusopivirus A
Grusopivirus B
Gryllus bimaculatus nudivirus
Guajara orthobunyavirus
Guama orthobunyavirus
Guanarito mammarenavirus
Guaroa orthobunyavirus
Guenon simian foamy virus
Guertu bandavirus
Guinea pig type-C oncovirus
Gull circovirus

H

Haartman hartmanivirus
Habenaria mosaic virus
Haemophilus virus HP1
Haemophilus virus HP2
Hagfish agnathovirus
Hainan sripuvirus
Hairy antennavirus
Halfbeak nidovirus 1
Haliotid herpesvirus 1
Haloarcula hispanica icosahedral virus 2
Haloarcula hispanica virus PH1
Haloarcula hispanica virus SH1
Haloarcula virus HCIV1
Halobacterium virus phiH
Halomonas virus HAP1
Hamiltonella virus APSE1
Hantaan orthohantavirus
Hardenbergia mosaic virus
Hardenbergia virus A
Hardy-Zuckerman feline sarcoma virus
Hare fibroma virus
Harkavirus A
Harrisina brillians granulovirus
Harrison sunrhavirus
Hart Park hapavirus
Harvey murine sarcoma virus
Havel River virus
Hazara orthonairovirus
Heartland bandavirus
Hebius tobanivirus 1
Hedgehog coronavirus 1
Hedyotis uncinella yellow mosaic virus
Hedyotis yellow mosaic betasatellite
Helenium virus S
Helianthus annuus alphaendornavirus
Helicobacter virus 1961P
Helicobacter virus KHP30
Helicobacter virus KHP40
Helicobasidium mompa alphaendornavirus 1
Helicobasidium mompa partitivirus V70
Helicobasidium mompa totivirus 1-17
Helicoverpa armigera granulovirus
Helicoverpa armigera nucleopolyhedrovirus
Helicoverpa armigera stunt virus
Heliothis armigera entomopoxvirus
Heliothis virescens ascovirus 3a
Heliothis zea nudivirus
Helleborus mosaic virus
Helleborus net necrosis virus
Helminthosporium victoriae virus 145S
Helminthosporium victoriae virus 190S
Hemidesmus yellow mosaic virus
Hemileuca species nucleopolyhedrovirus
Hemipivirus A
Hemipteran hemiambidensovirus 1
Hemipteran hemiambidensovirus 2
Hemipteran scindoambidensovirus 1
Henbane mosaic virus
Hendra henipavirus
Hepacivirus A
Hepacivirus B
Hepacivirus C
Hepacivirus D
Hepacivirus E
Hepacivirus F
Hepacivirus G
Hepacivirus H
Hepacivirus I
Hepacivirus J
Hepacivirus K
Hepacivirus L
Hepacivirus M
Hepacivirus N
Hepatitis B virus
Hepatitis delta virus
Hepatovirus A
Hepatovirus B
Hepatovirus C
Hepatovirus D
Hepatovirus E
Hepatovirus F
Hepatovirus G
Hepatovirus H
Hepatovirus I
Heracleum latent virus
Herbert herbevirus
Hermit mivirus
Heron hepatitis B virus
Hervey pararubulavirus
Heterobasidion partitivirus 1
Heterobasidion partitivirus 12
Heterobasidion partitivirus 13
Heterobasidion partitivirus 15
Heterobasidion partitivirus 2
Heterobasidion partitivirus 3
Heterobasidion partitivirus 7
Heterobasidion partitivirus 8
Heterobasidion partitivirus P
Heterocapsa circularisquama DNA virus 01
Heterocapsa circularisquama RNA virus 01
Heterosigma akashiwo RNA virus
Heterosigma akashiwo virus 01
Hibbertia virus Y
Hibiscus chlorotic ringspot virus
Hibiscus golden mosaic virus
Hibiscus green spot virus 2
Hibiscus latent Fort Pierce virus
Hibiscus latent ringspot virus
Hibiscus latent Singapore virus
High Plains wheat mosaic emaravirus
Highlands J virus
Himetobi P virus
Hincksia hinckiae virus a
Hippeastrum chlorotic ringspot orthotospovirus
Hippeastrum latent virus
Hippeastrum mosaic virus
Hippoboscid mivirus
Hippotragine gammaherpesvirus 1
Hirame novirhabdovirus
Hollyhock leaf curl virus
Hollyhock yellow vein alphasatellite
Hollyhock yellow vein mosaic virus
Hollyhock yellow vein virus
Holmes hapavirus
Homalodisca coagulata virus 1
Honeysuckle ringspot virus
Honeysuckle yellow vein betasatellite
Honeysuckle yellow vein mosaic betasatellite
Honeysuckle yellow vein virus
Hop latent viroid
Hop latent virus
Hop mosaic virus
Hop stunt viroid
Hop trefoil cryptic virus 1
Hop trefoil cryptic virus 2
Hop trefoil cryptic virus 3
Hoplichthys hoplichthysvirus
Hordeum mosaic virus
Hordeum vulgare alphaendornavirus
Hordeum vulgare BARE-1 virus
Horse associated cyclovirus 1
Horsefly horwuvirus
Horsegram yellow mosaic virus
Horseradish curly top virus
Horseradish latent virus
Hosta virus X
Hot pepper alphaendornavirus
Howler monkey associated porprismacovirus 1
Huangjiao thamnovirus
Huangpi uukuvirus
Hubei arlivirus
Hubei chipolycivirus
Hubei hubramonavirus
Hubei hupolycivirus
Hubei mivirus
Hubei odonate mivirus
Hubei peropuvirus
Hubei sclerotimonavirus
Hubei yingvirus
Hughes orthonairovirus
Human alphaherpesvirus 1
Human alphaherpesvirus 2
Human alphaherpesvirus 3
Human associated circovirus 1
Human associated cyclovirus 1
Human associated cyclovirus 10
Human associated cyclovirus 11
Human associated cyclovirus 12
Human associated cyclovirus 2
Human associated cyclovirus 3
Human associated cyclovirus 4
Human associated cyclovirus 5
Human associated cyclovirus 6
Human associated cyclovirus 7
Human associated cyclovirus 8
Human associated cyclovirus 9
Human associated gemykibivirus 1
Human associated gemykibivirus 2
Human associated gemykibivirus 3
Human associated gemykibivirus 4
Human associated gemykibivirus 5
Human associated gemyvongvirus 1
Human associated huchismacovirus 1
Human associated huchismacovirus 2
Human associated huchismacovirus 3
Human associated porprismacovirus 1
Human associated porprismacovirus 2
Human betaherpesvirus 5
Human betaherpesvirus 6A
Human betaherpesvirus 6B
Human betaherpesvirus 7
Human coronavirus 229E
Human coronavirus HKU1
Human coronavirus NL63
Human gammaherpesvirus 4
Human gammaherpesvirus 8
Human immunodeficiency virus 1
Human immunodeficiency virus 2
Human mastadenovirus A
Human mastadenovirus B
Human mastadenovirus C
Human mastadenovirus D
Human mastadenovirus E
Human mastadenovirus F
Human mastadenovirus G
Human metapneumovirus
Human orthopneumovirus
Human orthorubulavirus 2
Human orthorubulavirus 4
Human picobirnavirus
Human polyomavirus 1
Human polyomavirus 10
Human polyomavirus 11
Human polyomavirus 13
Human polyomavirus 14
Human polyomavirus 2
Human polyomavirus 3
Human polyomavirus 4
Human polyomavirus 5
Human polyomavirus 6
Human polyomavirus 7
Human polyomavirus 8
Human polyomavirus 9
Human respirovirus 1
Human respirovirus 3
Humulus japonicus latent virus
Hunnivirus A
Hunter Island bandavirus
Hyacinth mosaic virus
Hydra viridis Chlorella virus 1
Hydrangea chlorotic mottle virus
Hydrangea ringspot virus
Hymenopteran scindoambidensovirus 1
Hypericum associated gemycircularvirus 1
Hyphantria cunea nucleopolyhedrovirus
Hypomicrogaster canadensis bracovirus
Hypomicrogaster ectdytolophae bracovirus
Hyposidra talaca nucleopolyhedrovirus
Hyposoter annulipes ichnovirus
Hyposoter exiguae ichnovirus
Hyposoter fugitivus ichnovirus
Hyposoter lymantriae ichnovirus
Hyposoter pilosulus ichnovirus
Hyposoter rivalis ichnovirus

I

Iaco orthobunyavirus
Icoaraci phlebovirus
Ictalurid herpesvirus 1
Ictalurid herpesvirus 2
Idnoreovirus 1
Idnoreovirus 2
Idnoreovirus 3
Idnoreovirus 4
Idnoreovirus 5
Ieri virus
Iguanid herpesvirus 2
Ikoma lyssavirus
Ilesha orthobunyavirus
Ilheus virus
Illinois sclerotimonavirus
Imjin mivirus
Imjin thottimvirus
Impatiens flower break virus
Impatiens necrotic spot orthotospovirus
Imperata yellow mottle virus
Indian cassava mosaic virus
Indian citrus ringspot virus
Indian peanut clump virus
Indiana vesiculovirus
Indonesian soybean dwarf virus
Infectious bursal disease virus
Infectious flacherie virus
Infectious pancreatic necrosis virus
Infectious spleen and kidney necrosis virus
Influenza A virus
Influenza B virus
Influenza C virus
Influenza D virus
Infratovirus 1
Ingwavuma orthobunyavirus
Inhangapi arurhavirus
Insect shangavirus
Insect wuhivirus
Invertebrate iridescent virus 22
Invertebrate iridescent virus 25
Invertebrate iridescent virus 3
Invertebrate iridescent virus 31
Invertebrate iridescent virus 6
Invertebrate iridescent virus 9
Iodobacter virus PLPE
Iotaarterivirus debrazmo
Iotaarterivirus kibreg 1
Iotaarterivirus pejah
Iotapapillomavirus 1
Iotapapillomavirus 2
Ippy mammarenavirus
Iranian wheat stripe tenuivirus
Iresine viroid 1
Iriri curiovirus
Iris fulva mosaic virus
Iris mild mosaic virus
Iris severe mosaic virus
Iris yellow spot orthotospovirus
Irkut lyssavirus
Isaria javanica chrysovirus
Isfahan vesiculovirus
Island sawgrhavirus
Israel turkey meningoencephalomyelitis virus
Israeli acute paralysis virus
Itacaiunas curiovirus
Itaituba phlebovirus
Itaporanga phlebovirus
Ixcanal phlebovirus

J

Jaagsiekte sheep retrovirus
Jacquemontia mosaic Yucatan virus
Jacquemontia yellow mosaic virus
Jacquemontia yellow vein virus
Jalkavirus S08C159
Jamestown Canyon orthobunyavirus
Japanese encephalitis virus
Japanese holly fern mottle pteridovirus
Japanese iris necrotic ring virus
Japanese macaque simian foamy virus
Japanese soil-borne wheat mosaic virus
Japanese yam mosaic virus
Jasmine virus T
Jatobal orthobunyavirus
Jatropha leaf curl Gujarat virus
Jatropha leaf curl virus
Jatropha leaf yellow mosaic virus
Jatropha mosaic India virus
Jatropha mosaic Nigeria virus
Jatropha mosaic virus
Jatropha yellow mosaic virus
Jeju orthohantavirus
Jembrana disease virus
Jericarnavirus A
Jericarnavirus B
Johnsongrass chlorotic stripe mosaic virus
Johnsongrass mosaic virus
Johnston Atoll quaranjavirus
Joinjakaka hapavirus
Jonchet jonvirus
Jugra virus
Jujube mosaic-associated virus
Jun jeilongvirus
Juncopox virus
Jurona vesiculovirus
Jutiapa virus

K

Kabuto mountain uukuvirus
Kadam virus
Kadipiro virus
Kaeng Khoi orthobunyavirus
Kairi orthobunyavirus
Kaisodi uukuvirus
Kalanchoe latent virus
Kalanchoe mosaic virus
Kalanchoe top-spotting virus
Kamese hapavirus
Kanyawara ledantevirus
Kappaarterivirus wobum
Kappapapillomavirus 1
Kappapapillomavirus 2
Karimabad phlebovirus
Kashmir bee virus
Kasokero orthonairovirus
Kawavirus SWcelC56
Kedougou virus
Kenkeme orthohantavirus
Kennedya yellow mosaic virus
Kern Canyon ledantevirus
Keterah orthonairovirus
Keunjorong mosaic virus
Keuraliba ledantevirus
Keystone orthobunyavirus
Khabarovsk orthohantavirus
Khujand lyssavirus
Kibale herbevirus
Kigluaik phantom orthophasmavirus
Kimberley ephemerovirus
Kirsten murine sarcoma virus
Kismaayo bandavirus
Klamath tupavirus
Klebsiella virus 0507KN21
Klebsiella virus 1513
Klebsiella virus 2044-307w
Klebsiella virus 3LV2017
Klebsiella virus 4LV2017
Klebsiella virus AltoGao
Klebsiella virus BIS33
Klebsiella virus BO1E
Klebsiella virus F19
Klebsiella virus GHK3
Klebsiella virus Henu1
Klebsiella virus IL33
Klebsiella virus IME205
Klebsiella virus IME260
Klebsiella virus IME279
Klebsiella virus IME321
Klebsiella virus JD001
Klebsiella virus JD18
Klebsiella virus K11
Klebsiella virus K244
Klebsiella virus K5
Klebsiella virus K5-2
Klebsiella virus K5-4
Klebsiella virus K64-1
Klebsiella virus KLPN1
Klebsiella virus KN1-1
Klebsiella virus KN3-1
Klebsiella virus KN4-1
Klebsiella virus KOX1
Klebsiella virus Kp1
Klebsiella virus KP15
Klebsiella virus Kp2
Klebsiella virus KP27
Klebsiella virus KP32
Klebsiella virus KP32i192
Klebsiella virus KP32i194
Klebsiella virus KP32i195
Klebsiella virus KP32i196
Klebsiella virus KP34
Klebsiella virus KP36
Klebsiella virus KpCol1
Klebsiella virus KpKT21phi1
Klebsiella virus KPN N141
Klebsiella virus KPRio2015
Klebsiella virus KpS110
Klebsiella virus KpS2
Klebsiella virus kpssk3
Klebsiella virus KpV289
Klebsiella virus KpV41
Klebsiella virus KpV475
Klebsiella virus KpV48
Klebsiella virus KpV52
Klebsiella virus KpV522
Klebsiella virus KpV71
Klebsiella virus KpV74
Klebsiella virus KpV763
Klebsiella virus KpV766
Klebsiella virus KpV767
Klebsiella virus KpV80
Klebsiella virus KPV811
Klebsiella virus Matisse
Klebsiella virus May
Klebsiella virus Menlow
Klebsiella virus MezzoGao
Klebsiella virus Miro
Klebsiella virus myPSH1235
Klebsiella virus NJR15
Klebsiella virus NJS1
Klebsiella virus NJS2
Klebsiella virus Pharr
Klebsiella virus PKO111
Klebsiella virus PKP126
Klebsiella virus PMBT1
Klebsiella virus PRA33
Klebsiella virus RaK2
Klebsiella virus SHKp152234
Klebsiella virus SHKp152410
Klebsiella virus SU503
Klebsiella virus SU552A
Klebsiella virus Sugarland
Klebsiella virus Sushi
Klebsiella virus TAH8
Klebsiella virus TSK1
Klebsiella virus ZCKP1
Kluyvera virus Kvp1
Koala retrovirus
Kokobera virus
Kolente ledantevirus
Konjac mosaic virus
Koolpinyah ephemerovirus
Koongol orthobunyavirus
Kotonkan ephemerovirus
Koutango virus
Krakvirus S39C11
Kudzu mosaic virus
Kumasi ledantevirus
Kundal coltivirus
Kunsagivirus A
Kunsagivirus B
Kunsagivirus C
Kurthia virus 6
Kwatta sunrhavirus
Kyasanur Forest disease virus
Kyuri green mottle mosaic virus

L

La Crosse orthobunyavirus
La Gloria phlebovirus
La Joya hapavirus
Lacanobia oleracea granulovirus
Lacewing mivirus
Lactobacillus virus ATCC8014
Lactobacillus virus B2
Lactobacillus virus Bacchae
Lactobacillus virus Bromius
Lactobacillus virus c5
Lactobacillus virus Iacchus
Lactobacillus virus Lb
Lactobacillus virus Lb338-1
Lactobacillus virus LBR48
Lactobacillus virus Ld17
Lactobacillus virus Ld25A
Lactobacillus virus Ld3
Lactobacillus virus Ldl1
Lactobacillus virus Lenus
Lactobacillus virus LLKu
Lactobacillus virus LP65
Lactobacillus virus Lpa804
Lactobacillus virus Maenad
Lactobacillus virus Nyseid
Lactobacillus virus P1
Lactobacillus virus phiJL1
Lactobacillus virus phiLdb
Lactobacillus virus SAC12
Lactobacillus virus Satyr
Lactobacillus virus Semele
Lactobacillus virus ViSo2018a
Lactococcus virus 712
Lactococcus virus ASCC191
Lactococcus virus ASCC273
Lactococcus virus ASCC281
Lactococcus virus ASCC465
Lactococcus virus ASCC532
Lactococcus virus Bibb29
Lactococcus virus bIL170
Lactococcus virus bIL67
Lactococcus virus c2
Lactococcus virus CB13
Lactococcus virus CB14
Lactococcus virus CB19
Lactococcus virus CB20
Lactococcus virus jj50
Lactococcus virus KSY1
Lactococcus virus P008
Lactococcus virus P2
Lactococcus virus sk1
Lactococcus virus Sl4
Lactococcus virus WP2
Lagenaria mild mosaic virus
Lagenaria siceraria alphaendornavirus
Lagomorph bocaparvovirus 1
Lagos bat lyssavirus
Laguna Negra orthohantavirus
Laibin mobatvirus
Lake Sinai virus 1
Lake Sinai virus 2
Lama associated gemycircularvirus 1
Lambdaarterivirus afriporav
Lambdapapillomavirus 1
Lambdapapillomavirus 2
Lambdapapillomavirus 3
Lambdapapillomavirus 4
Lambdapapillomavirus 5
Lambdina fiscellaria nucleopolyhedrovirus
Lamium leaf distortion virus
Lamium mild mosaic virus
Landjia hapavirus
Langat virus
Langur virus
Lara phlebovirus
Lasius neglectus virus 1
Lasius neglectus virus 2
Lasius niger virus 1
Lassa mammarenavirus
Lates calcarifer birnavirus
Latino mammarenavirus
Lato River virus
Laurel Lake laulavirus
Lausannevirus
Le Dantec ledantevirus
Leanyer orthobunyavirus
Lebombo virus
Leclercia virus 10164-302
Leek white stripe virus
Leek yellow stripe virus
Leishmania RNA virus 1
Leishmania RNA virus 2
Lelliottia virus phD2B
Lemur associated porprismacovirus 1
Lentinula hubramonavirus
Lentinula lentinuvirus
Leonurus mosaic virus
Lepeophtheirus caligrhavirus
Lepidopteran hudovirus
Lepidopteran iteradensovirus 1
Lepidopteran iteradensovirus 2
Lepidopteran iteradensovirus 3
Lepidopteran iteradensovirus 4
Lepidopteran iteradensovirus 5
Lepidopteran protoambidensovirus 1
Leporid alphaherpesvirus 4
Leptomonas shilevirus
Leptonychotes weddellii polyomavirus 1
Leticia phlebovirus
Lettuce big-vein associated varicosavirus
Lettuce chlorosis virus
Lettuce infectious yellows virus
Lettuce Italian necrotic virus
Lettuce mosaic virus
Lettuce necrotic leaf curl virus
Lettuce necrotic yellows cytorhabdovirus
Lettuce ring necrosis ophiovirus
Lettuce speckles mottle virus
Lettuce virus X
Lettuce yellow mottle cytorhabdovirus
Leucania separata nucleopolyhedrovirus
Leuconostoc virus 1A4
Leuconostoc virus Lmd1
Leuconostoc virus LN03
Leuconostoc virus LN04
Leuconostoc virus LN12
Leuconostoc virus LN25
Leuconostoc virus LN34
Leuconostoc virus LN6B
Leuconostoc virus Ln8
Leuconostoc virus Ln9
Leuconostoc virus LNTR3
Leuconostoc virus P793
Liao ning virus
Ligustrum necrotic ringspot virus
Ligustrum virus A
Lihan uukuvirus
Lilac leaf chlorosis virus
Lilac ring mottle virus
Lilium henryi Del1 virus
Lily mottle virus
Lily symptomless virus
Lily virus X
Lily virus Y
Limnipivirus A
Limnipivirus B
Limnipivirus C
Limonium flower distortion virus
Lindernia anagallis yellow vein virus
Linepithema humile virus 2
Lishi arlivirus
Lishi mivirus
Lisianthus enation leaf curl virus
Listeria virus A511
Listeria virus AG20
Listeria virus List36
Listeria virus LMSP25
Listeria virus LMTA148
Listeria virus LMTA34
Listeria virus LP048
Listeria virus LP064
Listeria virus LP083-2
Listeria virus LP110
Listeria virus LP114
Listeria virus LP26
Listeria virus LP302
Listeria virus LP37
Listeria virus P100
Listeria virus P70
Listeria virus PSA
Listeria virus WIL1
Little cherry virus 1
Little cherry virus 2
Livupivirus A
Lizard atadenovirus A
Lleida bat lyssavirus
Lloviu cuevavirus
Locusta migratoria entomopoxvirus
Loei River mammarenavirus
Lolium latent virus
Lonchura maja polyomavirus 1
Lone Star bandavirus
Lonestar mivirus
Lonestar zarhavirus
Long-fingered bat hepatitis B virus
Longan witches broom-associated virus
Longquan loanvirus
Lonomia obliqua nucleopolyhedrovirus
Lophuromys jeilongvirus 1
Lophuromys jeilongvirus 2
Louping ill virus
Louse fly mivirus
Loxodonta africana polyomavirus 1
Lucerne Australian latent virus
Lucerne transient streak virus
Lucheng Rn rat coronavirus
Ludopivirus A
Ludwigia yellow vein Vietnam virus
Ludwigia yellow vein virus
Luffa yellow mosaic virus
Lujo mammarenavirus
Lumbo orthbunyavirus
Lumpy skin disease virus
Luna mammarenavirus
Lunk mammarenavirus
Lupinus mosaic virus
Luxi orthohantavirus
Lychnis ringspot virus
Lycianthes yellow mosaic virus
Lycodon tobanivirus 1
Lycopersicon esculentum ToRTL1 virus
Lycoris mild mottle virus
Lygus lineolaris virus 1
Lymantria dispar iflavirus 1
Lymantria dispar multiple nucleopolyhedrovirus
Lymantria xylina nucleopolyhedrovirus
Lymphocystis disease virus 1
Lymphocystis disease virus 2
Lymphocystis disease virus 3
Lymphocytic choriomeningitis mammarenavirus

M

Macaca fascicularis polyomavirus 1
Macaca mulatta polyomavirus 1
Macacine alphaherpesvirus 1
Macacine betaherpesvirus 3
Macacine betaherpesvirus 8
Macacine betaherpesvirus 9
Macacine gammaherpesvirus 10
Macacine gammaherpesvirus 11
Macacine gammaherpesvirus 12
Macacine gammaherpesvirus 4
Macacine gammaherpesvirus 5
Macacine gammaherpesvirus 8
Macaua orthobunyavirus
Machupo mammarenavirus
Maclura mosaic virus
Macrobrachium satellite virus 1
Macrophomina phaseolina chrysovirus
Macropodid alphaherpesvirus 1
Macropodid alphaherpesvirus 2
Macroptilium bright mosaic virus
Macroptilium common mosaic virus
Macroptilium golden mosaic virus
Macroptilium mosaic Puerto Rico virus
Macroptilium yellow mosaic Florida virus
Macroptilium yellow mosaic virus
Macroptilium yellow spot virus
Macroptilium yellow vein virus
Madariaga virus
Madrid orthobunyavirus
Magnaporthe magoulivirus 1
Magnaporthe oryzae chrysovirus
Magnaporthe oryzae polymycovirus 1
Magnaporthe oryzae virus 1
Magnaporthe oryzae virus 2
Maguari orthobunyavirus
Mahlapitsi orthoreovirus
Main Drain orthobunyavirus
Maize associated pteridovirus
Maize aumaivirus 1
Maize chlorotic dwarf virus
Maize chlorotic mottle virus
Maize dwarf mosaic virus
Maize fine streak gammanucleorhabdovirus
Maize Iranian mosaic alphanucleorhabdovirus
Maize mosaic alphanucleorhabdovirus
Maize necrotic streak virus
Maize rayado fino virus
Maize rough dwarf virus
Maize streak dwarfing virus
Maize streak Reunion virus
Maize streak virus
Maize striate mosaic virus
Maize stripe tenuivirus
Maize white line mosaic virus
Maize yellow dwarf virus RMV
Maize yellow mosaic virus
Maize yellow striate cytorhabdovirus
Maize-associated cytorhabdovirus
Mal de Rio Cuarto virus
Malagasivirus A
Malagasivirus B
Maldonado phlebovirus
Mallard associated gemycircularvirus 1
Mallard associated gemygorvirus 1
Malpais Spring vesiculovirus
Malva mosaic virus
Malva vein clearing virus
Malvastrum bright yellow mosaic virus
Malvastrum leaf curl betasatellite
Malvastrum leaf curl deltasatellite
Malvastrum leaf curl Guangdong betasatellite
Malvastrum leaf curl Philippines virus
Malvastrum leaf curl virus
Malvastrum yellow mosaic alphasatellite
Malvastrum yellow mosaic Cameroon alphasatellite
Malvastrum yellow mosaic Helshire virus
Malvastrum yellow mosaic Jamaica virus
Malvastrum yellow mosaic virus
Malvastrum yellow vein Cambodia virus
Malvastrum yellow vein Honghe virus
Malvastrum yellow vein Lahore virus
Malvastrum yellow vein virus
Malvastrum yellow vein Yunnan virus
Mamastrovirus 1
Mamastrovirus 10
Mamastrovirus 11
Mamastrovirus 12
Mamastrovirus 13
Mamastrovirus 14
Mamastrovirus 15
Mamastrovirus 16
Mamastrovirus 17
Mamastrovirus 18
Mamastrovirus 19
Mamastrovirus 2
Mamastrovirus 3
Mamastrovirus 4
Mamastrovirus 5
Mamastrovirus 6
Mamastrovirus 7
Mamastrovirus 8
Mamastrovirus 9
Mamestra brassicae multiple nucleopolyhedrovirus
Mamestra configurata nucleopolyhedrovirus A
Mamestra configurata nucleopolyhedrovirus B
Mammalian 1 orthobornavirus
Mammalian 2 orthobornavirus
Mammalian orthoreovirus
Mammalian orthorubulavirus 5
Mammalian orthorubulavirus 6
Mandrilline betaherpesvirus 1
Manitoba hapavirus
Mannheimia virus 1127AP1
Mannheimia virus PHL101
Manzanilla orthobunyavirus
Maporal orthohantavirus
Mapuera orthorubulavirus
Maraba vesiculovirus
Maracuja mosaic virus
Marburg marburgvirus
Marco hapavirus
Mariental mammarenavirus
Marine protobacilladnavirus 1
Marinomonas virus CB5A
Marinomonas virus CPP1m
Marituba orthobunyavirus
Marseillevirus marseillevirus
Maruca vitrata nucleopolyhedrovirus
Mashua virus Y
Mason-Pfizer monkey virus
Massilia phlebovirus
Mastomys natalensis polyomavirus 1
Mayaro virus
Meaban virus
Meadow saffron breaking virus
Measles morbillivirus
Mediterranean ruda virus
Medjerda phlebovirus
Megakepasma mosaic virus
Megrivirus A
Megrivirus B
Megrivirus C
Megrivirus D
Megrivirus E
Melandrium yellow fleck virus
Melanoplus sanguinipes entomopoxvirus
Melao orthobunyavirus
Meleagrid alphaherpesvirus 1
Meles meles polyomavirus 1
Melochia mosaic virus
Melochia yellow mosaic virus
Melolontha melolontha entomopoxvirus
Melon aphid-borne yellows virus
Melon chlorotic leaf curl virus
Melon chlorotic mosaic alphasatellite
Melon chlorotic mosaic virus
Melon mild mottle virus
Melon necrotic spot virus
Melon rugose mosaic virus
Melon severe mosaic orthotospovirus
Melon tenuivirus
Melon yellow mosaic virus
Melon yellow spot orthotospovirus
Melon yellowing-associated virus
Menangle pararubulavirus
Menghai almendravirus
Mengla dianlovirus
Merino Walk mammarenavirus
Mermet orthobunyavirus
Merremia mosaic Puerto Rico virus
Merremia mosaic virus
Mesocricetus auratus polyomavirus 1
Mesorhizobium virus Lo5R7ANS
Mesta yellow vein mosaic alphasatellite
Mesta yellow vein mosaic Bahraich virus
Microbacterium phage KaiHaiDragon
Microbacterium phage Paschalis
Microbacterium phage Quhwah
Microbacterium virus Appa
Microbacterium virus Armstrong
Microbacterium virus Dismas
Microbacterium virus Eden
Microbacterium virus Eleri
Microbacterium virus Fireman
Microbacterium virus Golden
Microbacterium virus Goodman
Microbacterium virus Hamlet
Microbacterium virus Hendrix
Microbacterium virus Hyperion
Microbacterium virus Ilzat
Microbacterium virus ISF9
Microbacterium virus Koji
Microbacterium virus Krampus
Microbacterium virus MementoMori
Microbacterium virus Metamorphoo
Microbacterium virus Min1
Microbacterium virus MuffinTheCat
Microbacterium virus Neferthena
Microbacterium virus OneinaGillian
Microbacterium virus Pikmin
Microbacterium virus RobsFeet
Microbacterium virus Schubert
Microbacterium virus Squash
Microbacterium virus Zeta1847
Microcystis virus Ma-LMM01
Microhyla letovirus 1
Micromonas pusilla reovirus
Micromonas pusilla virus SP1
Microplitis croceipes bracovirus
Microplitis demolitor bracovirus
Microtus arvalis polyomavirus 1
Middelburg virus
Middle East respiratory syndrome-related coronavirus
Midway nyavirus
Milk vetch dwarf alphasatellite 1
Milk vetch dwarf alphasatellite 2
Milk vetch dwarf alphasatellite 3
Milk vetch dwarf virus
Millipede wumivirus
Mimivirus-dependent virus Sputnik
Mimivirus-dependent virus Zamilon
Mimosa yellow leaf curl virus
Minatitlan orthobunyavirus
Miniopteran jeilongvirus
Miniopterus africanus polyomavirus 1
Miniopterus associated gemycircularvirus 1
Miniopterus bat coronavirus 1
Miniopterus bat coronavirus HKU8
Miniopterus schreibersii polyomavirus 1
Miniopterus schreibersii polyomavirus 2
Mink circovirus
Mink coronavirus 1
Minovirus A
Mint vein banding-associated virus
Mint virus 1
Mint virus 2
Mint virus X
Minto sawgrhavirus
Mirabilis jalapa mottle virus
Mirabilis leaf curl betasatellite
Mirabilis leaf curl virus
Mirabilis mosaic virus
Mirafiori lettuce big-vein ophiovirus
Miscanthus streak virus
Mischivirus A
Mischivirus B
Mischivirus C
Mischivirus D
Mobala mammarenavirus
Mocis latipes granulovirus
Modoc virus
Mojiang henipavirus
Mokola lyssavirus
Molluscum contagiosum virus
Moloney murine sarcoma virus
Molossus molossus polyomavirus 1
Momordica yellow mosaic betasatellite
Mona Grita phlebovirus
Mongoose associated gemycircularvirus 1
Mongoose associated gemykibivirus 1
Monkeypox virus
Monodontid alphaherpesvirus 1
Monomorium pharaonis virus 1
Monomorium pharaonis virus 2
Montana myotis leukoencephalitis virus
Montano orthohantavirus
Mopeia mammarenavirus
Morelia tobanivirus 1
Morganella virus MmP1
Morganella virus MP2
Moroccan pepper virus
Moroccan watermelon mosaic virus
Morogoro maize-associated alphanucleorhabdovirus
Morreton vesiculovirus
Mosavirus A
Mosavirus B
Mosqueiro hapavirus
Mosquito associated circovirus 1
Mosquito associated gemycircularvirus 1
Mosquito mivirus
Mosquito X virus
Mossman narmovirus
Mosso das Pedras virus
Mossuril hapavirus
Motherwort yellow mottle virus
Mothra mobuvirus
Mount Elgon bat ledantevirus
Mouse associated cyclovirus 1
Mouse mammary tumor virus
Moussa mousrhavirus
MPoko orthobunyavirus
Muarterivirus afrigant
Mucambo virus
Mud crab virus
Muikkunen hartmanivirus
Muir barhavirus
Mukawa phlebovirus
Mulberry badnavirus 1
Mulberry mosaic dwarf associated virus
Mulberry mosaic leaf roll associated virus
Mulberry ringspot virus
Mulberry vein banding associated orthotospovirus
Mule deerpox virus
Mume virus A
Mumps orthorubulavirus
Mungbean yellow mosaic betasatellite
Mungbean yellow mosaic India virus
Mungbean yellow mosaic virus
Munguba phlebovirus
Munia coronavirus HKU13
Mupapillomavirus 1
Mupapillomavirus 2
Mupapillomavirus 3
Mupivirus A
Murid betaherpesvirus 1
Murid betaherpesvirus 2
Murid betaherpesvirus 3
Murid betaherpesvirus 8
Murid gammaherpesvirus 4
Murid gammaherpesvirus 7
Murine coronavirus
Murine leukemia virus
Murine mastadenovirus A
Murine mastadenovirus B
Murine mastadenovirus C
Murine orthopneumovirus
Murine respirovirus
Murmansk microtuspox virus
Murray Valley encephalitis virus
Murre uukuvirus
Mus musculus polyomavirus 1
Mus musculus polyomavirus 2
Mus musculus polyomavirus 3
Musca hytrosavirus
Muscina stabulans sigmavirus
Mushroom bacilliform virus
Mustelid gammaherpesvirus 1
Mycobacterium virus 244
Mycobacterium virus 32HC
Mycobacterium virus Acadian
Mycobacterium virus Adawi
Mycobacterium virus Alice
Mycobacterium virus Alma
Mycobacterium virus Anaya
Mycobacterium virus Angelica
Mycobacterium virus Apizium
Mycobacterium virus Ardmore
Mycobacterium virus Arturo
Mycobacterium virus Astro
Mycobacterium virus Athena
Mycobacterium virus Avani
Mycobacterium virus Babsiella
Mycobacterium virus Backyardigan
Mycobacterium virus Baee
Mycobacterium virus Baka
Mycobacterium virus Bane1
Mycobacterium virus Barnyard
Mycobacterium virus Bask21
Mycobacterium virus Benedict
Mycobacterium virus Bernal13
Mycobacterium virus Bernardo
Mycobacterium virus Bethlehem
Mycobacterium virus Bignuz
Mycobacterium virus Billknuckles
Mycobacterium virus Bongo
Mycobacterium virus Boomer
Mycobacterium virus BPBiebs31
Mycobacterium virus Bron
Mycobacterium virus BrownCNA
Mycobacterium virus Brujita
Mycobacterium virus Bruns
Mycobacterium virus Brusacoram
Mycobacterium virus Butters
Mycobacterium virus Bxb1
Mycobacterium virus Bxz1
Mycobacterium virus Bxz2
Mycobacterium virus Charlie
Mycobacterium virus Che12
Mycobacterium virus Che8
Mycobacterium virus Che9c
Mycobacterium virus Che9d
Mycobacterium virus Chrisnmich
Mycobacterium virus CJW1
Mycobacterium virus Cooper
Mycobacterium virus Corndog
Mycobacterium virus Courthouse
Mycobacterium virus CrimD
Mycobacterium virus Cuco
Mycobacterium virus D29
Mycobacterium virus Dandelion
Mycobacterium virus DeadP
Mycobacterium virus Dlane
Mycobacterium virus Donovan
Mycobacterium virus Doom
Mycobacterium virus Dorothy
Mycobacterium virus DotProduct
Mycobacterium virus Drago
Mycobacterium virus Ericb
Mycobacterium virus Euphoria
Mycobacterium virus Eureka
Mycobacterium virus Faith1
Mycobacterium virus Ff47
Mycobacterium virus Fionnbharth
Mycobacterium virus Firecracker
Mycobacterium virus Fishburne
Mycobacterium virus Fruitloop
Mycobacterium virus Gadjet
Mycobacterium virus Gaia
Mycobacterium virus George
Mycobacterium virus Giles
Mycobacterium virus Gladiator
Mycobacterium virus Godines
Mycobacterium virus Goose
Mycobacterium virus GUmbie
Mycobacterium virus Halo
Mycobacterium virus Hammer
Mycobacterium virus Hawkeye
Mycobacterium virus Heldan
Mycobacterium virus HyRo
Mycobacterium virus I3
Mycobacterium virus Ibhubesi
Mycobacterium virus JAMaL
Mycobacterium virus Jasper
Mycobacterium virus JAWS
Mycobacterium virus JC27
Mycobacterium virus Jebeks
Mycobacterium virus Jeffabunny
Mycobacterium virus JHC117
Mycobacterium virus JoeDirt
Mycobacterium virus KBG
Mycobacterium virus Konstantine
Mycobacterium virus Kostya
Mycobacterium virus Kssjeb
Mycobacterium virus Kugel
Mycobacterium virus L5
Mycobacterium virus Larva
Mycobacterium virus Lesedi
Mycobacterium virus LHTSCC
Mycobacterium virus Liefie
Mycobacterium virus Littlee
Mycobacterium virus Llij
Mycobacterium virus lockley
Mycobacterium virus Lukilu
Mycobacterium virus MacnCheese
Mycobacterium virus Malithi
Mycobacterium virus Manad
Mycobacterium virus Marcell
Mycobacterium virus Marvin
Mycobacterium virus Michelle
Mycobacterium virus Microwolf
Mycobacterium virus Mosmoris
Mycobacterium virus Mozy
Mycobacterium virus Mrgordo
Mycobacterium virus Muddy
Mycobacterium virus Museum
Mycobacterium virus Mutaforma13
Mycobacterium virus Nappy
Mycobacterium virus Nepal
Mycobacterium virus Nigel
Mycobacterium virus Oline
Mycobacterium virus Omega
Mycobacterium virus Optimus
Mycobacterium virus Osmaximus
Mycobacterium virus Pacc40
Mycobacterium virus Packman
Mycobacterium virus Panchino
Mycobacterium virus Papyrus
Mycobacterium virus Patience
Mycobacterium virus PBI1
Mycobacterium virus Peaches
Mycobacterium virus Perseus
Mycobacterium virus Pg1
Mycobacterium virus Phayonce
Mycobacterium virus Phrann
Mycobacterium virus Pipefish
Mycobacterium virus Pipsqueaks
Mycobacterium virus Pixie
Mycobacterium virus Plot
Mycobacterium virus PMC
Mycobacterium virus Porky
Mycobacterium virus Predator
Mycobacterium virus Pukovnik
Mycobacterium virus Pumpkin
Mycobacterium virus Ramsey
Mycobacterium virus Rebeuca
Mycobacterium virus Redi
Mycobacterium virus Redrock
Mycobacterium virus Reprobate
Mycobacterium virus Rey
Mycobacterium virus Ridgecb
Mycobacterium virus Rockstar
Mycobacterium virus RockyHorror
Mycobacterium virus Rosebush
Mycobacterium virus Rumpelstiltskin
Mycobacterium virus Saintus
Mycobacterium virus Sbash
Mycobacterium virus Sebata
Mycobacterium virus Send513
Mycobacterium virus SG4
Mycobacterium virus Shauna1
Mycobacterium virus Shilan
Mycobacterium virus Sirduracell
Mycobacterium virus Skinnyp
Mycobacterium virus Skipole
Mycobacterium virus Solon
Mycobacterium virus Soto
Mycobacterium virus Spartacus
Mycobacterium virus Stinger
Mycobacterium virus Suffolk
Mycobacterium virus Switzer
Mycobacterium virus SWU1
Mycobacterium virus TA17a
Mycobacterium virus Taj
Mycobacterium virus Thibault
Mycobacterium virus Tiger
Mycobacterium virus Timshel
Mycobacterium virus TM4
Mycobacterium virus Tortellini
Mycobacterium virus Toto
Mycobacterium virus Trixie
Mycobacterium virus Turbido
Mycobacterium virus Tweety
Mycobacterium virus Twister
Mycobacterium virus U2
Mycobacterium virus Vincenzo
Mycobacterium virus Violet
Mycobacterium virus Wee
Mycobacterium virus Wildcat
Mycobacterium virus Wonder
Mycobacterium virus Xeno
Mycobacterium virus Yoshi
Mycobacterium virus Zemanar
Mycoplasma virus P1
Mycoreovirus 1
Mycoreovirus 2
Mycoreovirus 3
Mynahpox virus
Myodes coronavirus 2JL14
Myodes glareolus polyomavirus 1
Myodes jeilongvirus
Myodes narmovirus
Myotis lucifugus polyomavirus 1
Myotis ricketti alphacoronavirus Sax-2011
Myriapod hubavirus
Myriapod mivirus
Myriotrichia clavaeformis virus a
Myrmica scabrinodis virus 1
Myrobalan latent ringspot virus
Myrropivirus A
Mythimna separata entomopoxvirus
Mythimna unipuncta granulovirus A
Mythimna unipuncta granulovirus B
Mythimna unipuncta nucleopolyhedrovirus A
Mythimna unipuncta nucleopolyhedrovirus B
Myxococcus virus Mx8
Myxoma virus

N

Nacovirus A
Nairobi sheep disease orthonairovirus
Nangarvirus 1
Naples phlebovirus
Narcissus common latent virus
Narcissus degeneration virus
Narcissus late season yellows virus
Narcissus latent virus
Narcissus mosaic virus
Narcissus yellow stripe virus
Nariva narmovirus
Natrinema virus SNJ1
Ndumu virus
Neckar River virus
Necocli orthohantavirus
Nectarine marafivirus M
Nectarine stem pitting associated virus
Nelson Bay orthoreovirus
Nemesia ring necrosis virus
Neoavian orthoreovirus
Neodiprion lecontei nucleopolyhedrovirus
Neodiprion sertifer nucleopolyhedrovirus
Nerine latent virus
Nerine virus X
Nerine yellow stripe virus
New Jersey vesiculovirus
Newbury 1 virus
Ngaingan hapavirus
Niakha sripuvirus
Nicotiana tabacum Tnt1 virus
Nicotiana tabacum Tto1 virus
Night heron coronavirus HKU19
Nilaparvata lugens honeydew virus 1
Nilaparvata lugens reovirus
Nile crocodilepox virus
Nipah henipavirus
Nique phlebovirus
Nishimuro ledantevirus
Nitmarvirus NSV1
Nkolbisson ledantevirus
NL63-related bat coronavirus strain BtKYNL63-9b
Nodamura virus
Nohivirus S31C1
Nonlabens virus P12024L
Nonlabens virus P12024S
Nootka lupine vein clearing virus
Nordland virus
Northcreek ohlsrhavirus
Northern cereal mosaic cytorhabdovirus
Norwalk virus
Norway ixovirus
Nothoscordum mosaic virus
Nova mobatvirus
Ntaya virus
Ntepes phlebovirus
Nuarterivirus guemel
Nudaurelia capensis beta virus
Nudaurelia capensis omega virus
Nupapillomavirus 1
Nyamanini nyavirus
Nyando orthobunyavirus
Nyctalus velutinus alphacoronavirus SC-2013
Nylanderia fulva virus 1

O

Oakvale sunrhavirus
Oat blue dwarf virus
Oat chlorotic stunt virus
Oat dwarf virus
Oat golden stripe virus
Oat mosaic virus
Oat necrotic mottle virus
Oat sterile dwarf virus
Obodhiang ephemerovirus
Obuda pepper virus
Odonata associated gemycircularvirus 1
Odonata associated gemycircularvirus 2
Odonate anphevirus
Odonate arlivirus
Odonate mivirus
Odonate orthophasmavirus
Odonate peropuvirus
Odontoglossum ringspot virus
Odrenisrou phlebovirus
Oedaleus senegalensis entomopoxvirus
Ohlsdorf ohlsrhavirus
Oinezvirus S37C6
Oita ledantevirus
Okahandja mammarenavirus
Okavirus 1
Okra enation leaf curl alphasatellite
Okra enation leaf curl virus
Okra leaf curl Oman betasatellite
Okra leaf curl Oman virus
Okra mosaic virus
Okra mottle virus
Okra yellow crinkle Cameroon alphasatellite
Okra yellow crinkle virus
Okra yellow mosaic Mexico virus
Olesicampe benefactor ichnovirus
Olesicampe geniculatae ichnovirus
Olifantsvlei orthobunyavirus
Oligodon snake nidovirus 1
Olive latent ringspot virus
Olive latent virus 1
Olive latent virus 2
Olive latent virus 3
Olive leaf yellowing-associated virus
Olive mild mosaic virus
Oliveros mammarenavirus
Omegapapillomavirus 1
Omikronpapillomavirus 1
Omsk hemorrhagic fever virus
Oncorhynchus aquaparamyxovirus
Onion yellow dwarf virus
Ononis yellow mosaic virus
Onyong-nyong virus
Operophtera brumata entomopoxvirus
Operophtera brumata nucleopolyhedrovirus
Ophiostoma mitovirus 3a
Ophiostoma mitovirus 4
Ophiostoma mitovirus 5
Ophiostoma mitovirus 6
Ophiostoma partitivirus 1
Opium poppy mosaic virus
Opuntia chlorotic ringspot virus
Opuntia virus X
Orchid fleck dichorhavirus
Ord River hapavirus
Ordinary reptarenavirus
Orf virus
Orgyia leucostigma nucleopolyhedrovirus
Orgyia pseudotsugata multiple nucleopolyhedrovirus
Oriboca orthobunyavirus
Orinoco orinovirus
Orivirus A
Oriximina phlebovirus
Ornithogalum mosaic virus
Ornithogalum virus 2
Ornithogalum virus 3
Oropouche orthobunyavirus
Orthohepevirus A
Orthohepevirus B
Orthohepevirus C
Orthohepevirus D
Orthopteran anphevirus
Orthopteran miniambidensovirus 1
Orthopteran scindoambidensovirus 1
Orungo virus
Oryctes rhinoceros nudivirus
Oryza australiensis RIRE1 virus
Oryza longistaminata Retrofit virus
Oryza rufipogon alphaendornavirus
Oryza sativa alphaendornavirus
Oscivirus A
Ostreid herpesvirus 1
Ostreococcus tauri virus OtV5
Ostrich associated gemytondvirus 1
Otomops martiensseni polyomavirus 1
Otomops martiensseni polyomavirus 2
Ourmia melon virus
Ovine atadenovirus D
Ovine gammaherpesvirus 2
Ovine mastadenovirus A
Ovine mastadenovirus B
Ovine mastadenovirus C
Oxalis yellow vein virus
Oxbow orthohantavirus
Oxyplax ochracea nucleopolyhedrovirus

P

Pacific coast uukuvirus
Pacui pacuvirus
Paenibacillus virus Diva
Paenibacillus virus Harrison
Paenibacillus virus Hb10c2
Paenibacillus virus Lily
Paenibacillus virus Rani
Paenibacillus virus Shelly
Paenibacillus virus Sitara
Paenibacillus virus Tripp
Paenibacillus virus Vegas
Paenibacillus virus Willow
Pagavirus S05C849
Pagoda yellow mosaic associated virus
Paguronivirus 1
Palmarnavirus 128
Palmarnavirus 156
Palmarnavirus 473
Palyam virus
Pan troglodytes polyomavirus 1
Pan troglodytes polyomavirus 2
Pan troglodytes polyomavirus 3
Pan troglodytes polyomavirus 4
Pan troglodytes polyomavirus 5
Pan troglodytes polyomavirus 6
Pan troglodytes polyomavirus 7
Pan troglodytes polyomavirus 8
Panax virus Y
Pangola stunt virus
Panicum mosaic virus
Panicum papanivirus 1
Panicum streak virus
Panine alphaherpesvirus 3
Panine betaherpesvirus 2
Panine gammaherpesvirus 1
Pantoea virus AAS23
Pantoea virus LIMElight
Pantoea virus LIMEzero
Pantoea virus Vid5
Papaya cytorhabdovirus
Papaya leaf crumple virus
Papaya leaf curl betasatellite
Papaya leaf curl China betasatellite
Papaya leaf curl China virus
Papaya leaf curl Guandong virus
Papaya leaf curl India betasatellite
Papaya leaf curl virus
Papaya leaf distortion mosaic virus
Papaya lethal yellowing virus
Papaya mosaic virus
Papaya ringspot virus
Papiine alphaherpesvirus 2
Papiine betaherpesvirus 3
Papiine betaherpesvirus 4
Papiine gammaherpesvirus 1
Papio cynocephalus polyomavirus 1
Papio cynocephalus polyomavirus 2
Paprika mild mottle virus
Parabovirus A
Parabovirus B
Parabovirus C
Paracoccus virus Shpa
Paraguayan mammarenavirus
Paramecium bursaria Chlorella virus 1
Paramecium bursaria Chlorella virus A1
Paramecium bursaria Chlorella virus AL1A
Paramecium bursaria Chlorella virus AL2A
Paramecium bursaria Chlorella virus BJ2C
Paramecium bursaria Chlorella virus CA4A
Paramecium bursaria Chlorella virus CA4B
Paramecium bursaria Chlorella virus IL3A
Paramecium bursaria Chlorella virus NC1A
Paramecium bursaria Chlorella virus NE8A
Paramecium bursaria Chlorella virus NY2A
Paramecium bursaria Chlorella virus NYs1
Paramecium bursaria Chlorella virus SC1A
Paramecium bursaria Chlorella virus XY6E
Paramecium bursaria Chlorella virus XZ3A
Paramecium bursaria Chlorella virus XZ4A
Paramecium bursaria Chlorella virus XZ4C
Parechovirus A
Parechovirus B
Parechovirus C
Parechovirus D
Parechovirus E
Parechovirus F
Pariacoto virus
Parietaria mottle virus
Paris mosaic necrosis virus
Parrot hepatitis B virus
Parry Creek hapavirus
Parsnip mosaic virus
Parsnip yellow fleck virus
Pasivirus A
Paspalum dilatatum striate mosaic virus
Paspalum striate mosaic virus
Passeriform 1 orthobornavirus
Passeriform 2 orthobornavirus
Passerivirus A
Passerivirus B
Passiflora chlorosis virus
Passiflora edulis symptomless virus
Passiflora latent virus
Passion fruit mosaic virus
Passion fruit woodiness virus
Passion fruit yellow mosaic virus
Passionfruit leaf curl virus
Passionfruit leaf distortion virus
Passionfruit severe leaf distortion virus
Pasteurella virus F108
Pasteurella virus PHB01
Pasteurella virus PHB02
Patois orthobunyavirus
Pavonia mosaic virus
Pavonia yellow mosaic virus
Pea early-browning virus
Pea enation mosaic virus 1
Pea enation mosaic virus 2
Pea green mottle virus
Pea leaf distortion virus
Pea mild mosaic virus
Pea necrotic yellow dwarf alphasatellite 1
Pea necrotic yellow dwarf alphasatellite 2
Pea necrotic yellow dwarf virus
Pea seed-borne mosaic virus
Pea stem necrosis virus
Pea streak virus
Pea yellow stunt virus
Peach chlorotic mottle virus
Peach latent mosaic viroid
Peach marafivirus D
Peach mosaic virus
Peach rosette mosaic virus
Peanut chlorotic streak virus
Peanut clump virus
Peanut mottle virus
Peanut stunt virus
Peanut yellow mosaic virus
Pear blister canker viroid
Peaton orthobunyavirus
Pecan mosaic-associated virus
Pectinobacterium virus CBB
Pectinobacterium virus PEAT2
Pectobacterium virus Arno160
Pectobacterium virus CB5
Pectobacterium virus Clickz
Pectobacterium virus DUPPII
Pectobacterium virus DUPPV
Pectobacterium virus fM1
Pectobacterium virus Gaspode
Pectobacterium virus Jarilo
Pectobacterium virus Khlen
Pectobacterium virus Koot
Pectobacterium virus Lelidair
Pectobacterium virus My1
Pectobacterium virus Nobby
Pectobacterium virus Peat1
Pectobacterium virus phiTE
Pectobacterium virus Phoria
Pectobacterium virus PM1
Pectobacterium virus PP1
Pectobacterium virus PP101
Pectobacterium virus PP16
Pectobacterium virus PP2
Pectobacterium virus PP47
Pectobacterium virus PP74
Pectobacterium virus PP81
Pectobacterium virus PP90
Pectobacterium virus PP99
Pectobacterium virus PPWS1
Pectobacterium virus PPWS2
Pectobacterium virus PPWS4
Pectobacterium virus Zenivior
Pedilanthus leaf curl alphasatellite
Pedilanthus leaf curl virus
Pediococcus virus cIP1
Pedosvirus S28C3
Pegivirus A
Pegivirus B
Pegivirus C
Pegivirus D
Pegivirus E
Pegivirus F
Pegivirus G
Pegivirus H
Pegivirus I
Pegivirus J
Pegivirus K
Pekhitvirus S04C24
Pelagibacter virus HTVC011P
Pelagibacter virus HTVC019P
Pelagivirus S35C6
Pelargonium chlorotic ring pattern virus
Pelargonium flower break virus
Pelargonium leaf curl virus
Pelargonium line pattern virus
Pelargonium necrotic spot virus
Pelargonium ringspot virus
Pelargonium zonate spot virus
Pemapivirus A
Pena Blanca phlebovirus
Penguin siadenovirus A
Penguinpox virus
Penicillium brevicompactum virus
Penicillium chrysogenum virus
Penicillium cyaneofulvum virus
Penicillium digitatum polymycovirus 1
Penicillium janczewskii chrysovirus 1
Penicillium janczewskii chrysovirus 2
Penicillium stoloniferum virus F
Penicillium stoloniferum virus S
Penicillum brevicompactum polymycovirus 1
Pennisetum mosaic virus
Pepino mosaic virus
Pepo aphid-borne yellows virus
Pepper chat fruit viroid
Pepper chlorotic spot orthotospovirus
Pepper cryptic virus 1
Pepper cryptic virus 2
Pepper golden mosaic virus
Pepper huasteco yellow vein virus
Pepper leaf curl Bangladesh virus
Pepper leaf curl Lahore virus
Pepper leaf curl virus
Pepper leaf curl Yunnan virus
Pepper leafroll virus
Pepper mild mottle virus
Pepper mottle virus
Pepper ringspot virus
Pepper severe mosaic virus
Pepper vein yellows virus 1
Pepper vein yellows virus 2
Pepper vein yellows virus 3
Pepper vein yellows virus 4
Pepper vein yellows virus 5
Pepper vein yellows virus 6
Pepper veinal mottle virus
Pepper yellow leaf curl Aceh virus
Pepper yellow leaf curl Indonesia virus
Pepper yellow leaf curl Indonesia virus 2
Pepper yellow leaf curl Thailand virus
Pepper yellow leaf curl virus
Pepper yellow mosaic virus
Pepper yellow vein Mali virus
Perch perhabdovirus
Peridroma saucia nucleopolyhedrovirus
Perigonia lusca nucleopolyhedrovirus
Perina nuda virus
Perinet vesiculovirus
Persea americana alphaendornavirus 1
Persea americana chrysovirus
Persimmon cytorhabdovirus
Persimmon virus B
Peru tomato mosaic virus
Peruvian horse sickness virus
Pestivirus A
Pestivirus B
Pestivirus C
Pestivirus D
Pestivirus E
Pestivirus F
Pestivirus G
Pestivirus H
Pestivirus I
Pestivirus J
Pestivirus K
Petunia asteroid mosaic virus
Petunia vein banding virus
Petunia vein clearing virus
Pfaffia mosaic virus
Phaius virus X
Phanerotoma flavitestacea bracovirus
Phaseolus vulgaris alphaendornavirus 1
Phaseolus vulgaris alphaendornavirus 2
Phaseolus vulgaris alphaendornavirus 3
Phaseolus vulgaris Tpv2-6 virus
Phasi Charoen-like phasivirus
Philosamia cynthia x ricini virus
Phipapillomavirus 1
Phlomis mottle virus
Phlox virus B
Phlox virus M
Phlox virus S
Phnom Penh bat virus
Phocid alphaherpesvirus 1
Phocid gammaherpesvirus 2
Phocid gammaherpesvirus 3
Phocine morbillivirus
Pholetesor ornigis bracovirus
Phormidium virus WMP3
Phormidium virus WMP4
Phthorimaea operculella granulovirus
Phyllosphere sclerotimonavirus
Physalis mottle virus
Physarum polycephalum Tp1 virus
Physostegia chlorotic mottle alphanucleorhabdovirus
Phytophthora alphaendornavirus 1
Pidgey pidchovirus
Pigeon aviadenovirus A
Pigeon aviadenovirus B
Pigeon circovirus
Pigeonpea sterility mosaic emaravirus 1
Pigeonpea sterility mosaic emaravirus 2
Pigeonpox virus
Pike fry sprivivirus
Pilayella littoralis virus 1
Piliocolobus badius polyomavirus 1
Piliocolobus rufomitratus polyomavirus 1
Pillworm peropuvirus
Pineapple bacilliform CO virus
Pineapple bacilliform ER virus
Pineapple mealybug wilt-associated virus 1
Pineapple mealybug wilt-associated virus 2
Pineapple mealybug wilt-associated virus 3
Pinniped bocaparvovirus 1
Pinniped bocaparvovirus 2
Pinniped copiparvovirus 1
Pinniped dependoparvovirus 1
Pinniped erythroparvovirus 1
Pipapillomavirus 1
Pipapillomavirus 2
Piper yellow mottle virus
Pipistrellus bat coronavirus HKU5
Pipistrellus kuhlii coronavirus 3398
Pirital mammarenavirus
Piry vesiculovirus
Piscihepevirus A
Piscine novirhabdovirus
Piscine orthoreovirus
Pistachio ampelovirus A
Pistacia emaravirus B
Pitaya virus X
Pixuna virus
Planalto mammarenavirus
Planidovirus 1
Plantago asiatica mosaic virus
Plantago lanceolata latent virus
Plantago mottle virus
Plantain virus X
Platycodon mild mottle virus
Platyrrhini mastadenovirus A
Plautia stali intestine virus
Pleione virus Y
Pleurotus ostreatus virus 1
Plodia interpunctella granulovirus
Plum bark necrosis stem pitting-associated virus
Plum pox virus
Plumeria mosaic virus
Plutella xylostella granulovirus
Poa semilatent virus
Poaceae associated gemycircularvirus 1
Podivirus S05C243
Podovirus Lau218
Poecivirus A
Poinsettia latent virus
Poinsettia mosaic virus
Pokeweed mosaic virus
Polar bear mastadenovirus A
Polaribacter virus P12002L
Polaribacter virus P12002S
Polygonum ringspot orthotospovirus
Pomona bat hepatitis B virus
Pongine gammaherpesvirus 2
Pongo abelii polyomavirus 1
Pongo pygmaeus polyomavirus 1
Poplar mosaic virus
Porcine associated gemycircularvirus 1
Porcine associated gemycircularvirus 2
Porcine associated porprismacovirus 1
Porcine associated porprismacovirus 10
Porcine associated porprismacovirus 2
Porcine associated porprismacovirus 3
Porcine associated porprismacovirus 4
Porcine associated porprismacovirus 5
Porcine associated porprismacovirus 6
Porcine associated porprismacovirus 7
Porcine associated porprismacovirus 8
Porcine associated porprismacovirus 9
Porcine circovirus 1
Porcine circovirus 2
Porcine circovirus 3
Porcine epidemic diarrhea virus
Porcine mastadenovirus A
Porcine mastadenovirus B
Porcine mastadenovirus C
Porcine orthorubulavirus
Porcine respirovirus 1
Porcine torovirus
Porcine type-C oncovirus
Possum atadenovirus A
Potamipivirus A
Potamipivirus B
Potato aucuba mosaic virus
Potato black ringspot virus
Potato latent virus
Potato leafroll virus
Potato mop-top virus
Potato necrosis virus
Potato spindle tuber viroid
Potato virus A
Potato virus B
Potato virus H
Potato virus M
Potato virus P
Potato virus S
Potato virus T
Potato virus U
Potato virus V
Potato virus X
Potato virus Y
Potato yellow blotch virus
Potato yellow dwarf alphanucleorhabdovirus
Potato yellow mosaic Panama virus
Potato yellow mosaic virus
Potato yellow vein virus
Pothos latent virus
Potosi orthobunyavirus
Pouzolzia golden mosaic virus
Pouzolzia mosaic Guangdong virus
Pouzolzia yellow mosaic virus
Powassan virus
Powvirus S08C41
Precarious Point uukuvirus
Premna leaf curl virus
Primate bocaparvovirus 1
Primate bocaparvovirus 2
Primate erythroparvovirus 1
Primate erythroparvovirus 2
Primate erythroparvovirus 3
Primate erythroparvovirus 4
Primate loriparvovirus 1
Primate protoparvovirus 1
Primate protoparvovirus 2
Primate protoparvovirus 3
Primate protoparvovirus 4
Primate T-lymphotropic virus 1
Primate T-lymphotropic virus 2
Primate T-lymphotropic virus 3
Primate tetraparvovirus 1
Primula malacoides virus 1
Privet idaeovirus
Privet ringspot virus
Prochlorococcus virus 951510a
Prochlorococcus virus MED4-213
Prochlorococcus virus NATL1A7
Prochlorococcus virus NATL2A133
Prochlorococcus virus PGSP1
Prochlorococcus virus PHM1
Prochlorococcus virus PHM2
Prochlorococcus virus PSSM2
Prochlorococcus virus PSSM7
Prochlorococcus virus PSSP10
Prochlorococcus virus PSSP3
Prochlorococcus virus PSSP7
Prochlorococcus virus PTIM40
Prochlorococcus virus SS120-1
Prochlorococcus virus Syn1
Prochlorococcus virus Syn33
Procyon lotor polyomavirus 1
Procyon lotor polyomavirus 2
Propionibacterium virus Anatole
Propionibacterium virus ATCC29399BC
Propionibacterium virus ATCC29399BT
Propionibacterium virus Attacne
Propionibacterium virus B22
Propionibacterium virus B3
Propionibacterium virus B5
Propionibacterium virus Doucette
Propionibacterium virus E6
Propionibacterium virus G4
Propionibacterium virus Keiki
Propionibacterium virus Kubed
Propionibacterium virus Lauchelly
Propionibacterium virus MrAK
Propionibacterium virus Ouroboros
Propionibacterium virus P1.1
Propionibacterium virus P1001
Propionibacterium virus P100A
Propionibacterium virus P100D
Propionibacterium virus P101A
Propionibacterium virus P104A
Propionibacterium virus P105
Propionibacterium virus P144
Propionibacterium virus P91
Propionibacterium virus PA6
Propionibacterium virus Pacnes201215
Propionibacterium virus PAD20
Propionibacterium virus PAS50
Propionibacterium virus PFR1
Propionibacterium virus PHL009M11
Propionibacterium virus PHL025M00
Propionibacterium virus PHL037M02
Propionibacterium virus PHL041M10
Propionibacterium virus PHL060L00
Propionibacterium virus PHL067M01
Propionibacterium virus PHL070N00
Propionibacterium virus PHL071N05
Propionibacterium virus PHL082M03
Propionibacterium virus PHL092M00
Propionibacterium virus PHL095N00
Propionibacterium virus PHL111M01
Propionibacterium virus PHL112N00
Propionibacterium virus PHL113M01
Propionibacterium virus PHL114L00
Propionibacterium virus PHL116M00
Propionibacterium virus PHL117M00
Propionibacterium virus PHL117M01
Propionibacterium virus PHL132N00
Propionibacterium virus PHL141N00
Propionibacterium virus PHL151M00
Propionibacterium virus PHL151N00
Propionibacterium virus PHL152M00
Propionibacterium virus PHL163M00
Propionibacterium virus PHL171M01
Propionibacterium virus PHL179M00
Propionibacterium virus PHL194M00
Propionibacterium virus PHL199M00
Propionibacterium virus PHL301M00
Propionibacterium virus PHL308M00
Propionibacterium virus Pirate
Propionibacterium virus Procrass1
Propionibacterium virus SKKY
Propionibacterium virus Solid
Propionibacterium virus Stormborn
Propionibacterium virus Wizzo
Prospect Hill orthohantavirus
Protapanteles paleacritae bracovirus
Proteus virus Isfahan
Proteus virus PM116
Proteus virus PM135
Proteus virus PM16
Proteus virus Pm5460
Proteus virus PM75
Proteus virus PM85
Proteus virus PM93
Proteus virus Stubb
Providence virus
Providencia virus PR1
Providencia virus PS3
Prune dwarf virus
Prunus latent virus
Prunus necrotic ringspot virus
Prunus virus F
Prunus virus T
Pseudoalteromonas virus C5a
Pseudoalteromonas virus Cr39582
Pseudoalteromonas virus J2-1
Pseudoalteromonas virus PM2
Pseudocowpox virus
Pseudomonas virus 119X
Pseudomonas virus 130-113
Pseudomonas virus 141
Pseudomonas virus 15pyo
Pseudomonas virus 17A
Pseudomonas virus 22PfluR64PP
Pseudomonas virus 42
Pseudomonas virus 73
Pseudomonas virus Ab03
Pseudomonas virus Ab05
Pseudomonas virus Ab09
Pseudomonas virus Ab18
Pseudomonas virus Ab19
Pseudomonas virus Ab22
Pseudomonas virus Ab26
Pseudomonas virus Ab28
Pseudomonas virus ABTNL
Pseudomonas virus Achelous
Pseudomonas virus Alpheus
Pseudomonas virus Andromeda
Pseudomonas virus B3
Pseudomonas virus Bf7
Pseudomonas virus Bjorn
Pseudomonas virus C171
Pseudomonas virus CAb02
Pseudomonas virus CAb1
Pseudomonas virus CEBDP1
Pseudomonas virus CHU
Pseudomonas virus D3
Pseudomonas virus D3112
Pseudomonas virus DL60
Pseudomonas virus DL62
Pseudomonas virus DL68
Pseudomonas virus DMS3
Pseudomonas virus Dobby
Pseudomonas virus E215
Pseudomonas virus E217
Pseudomonas virus EL
Pseudomonas virus F116
Pseudomonas virus f2
Pseudomonas virus F8
Pseudomonas virus FHA0480
Pseudomonas virus G1
Pseudomonas virus gh1
Pseudomonas virus H66
Pseudomonas virus Henninger
Pseudomonas virus IBBPF7A
Pseudomonas virus JBD67
Pseudomonas virus JD18
Pseudomonas virus JG004
Pseudomonas virus JG024
Pseudomonas virus Kakheti25
Pseudomonas virus kF77
Pseudomonas virus KIL2
Pseudomonas virus KIL4
Pseudomonas virus KNP
Pseudomonas virus KPP10
Pseudomonas virus KPP12
Pseudomonas virus KPP21
Pseudomonas virus KPP25
Pseudomonas virus KTN6
Pseudomonas virus Lana
Pseudomonas virus LBL3
Pseudomonas virus LIT1
Pseudomonas virus LKA1
Pseudomonas virus LKD16
Pseudomonas virus LKO4
Pseudomonas virus LMA2
Pseudomonas virus LPB1
Pseudomonas virus LUZ19
Pseudomonas virus LUZ24
Pseudomonas virus LUZ7
Pseudomonas virus M6
Pseudomonas virus MAG1
Pseudomonas virus MP1412
Pseudomonas virus MP22
Pseudomonas virus MP29
Pseudomonas virus MP38
Pseudomonas virus MPK6
Pseudomonas virus MPK7
Pseudomonas virus Nerthus
Pseudomonas virus NFS
Pseudomonas virus NH4
Pseudomonas virus nickie
Pseudomonas virus Njord
Pseudomonas virus Noxifer
Pseudomonas virus NP1
Pseudomonas virus NV1
Pseudomonas virus NV3
Pseudomonas virus PA10
Pseudomonas virus PA1KOR
Pseudomonas virus PA26
Pseudomonas virus PA5
Pseudomonas virus PA7
Pseudomonas virus PAA2
Pseudomonas virus PaBG
Pseudomonas virus PAE1
Pseudomonas virus PAKP1
Pseudomonas virus PAKP2
Pseudomonas virus PAKP3
Pseudomonas virus PAKP4
Pseudomonas virus PaMx11
Pseudomonas virus PaMx25
Pseudomonas virus PaMx28
Pseudomonas virus PaMx74
Pseudomonas virus PaP1
Pseudomonas virus PaP3
Pseudomonas virus PaP4
Pseudomonas virus PAXYB1
Pseudomonas virus PB1
Pseudomonas virus Pf1
Pseudomonas virus Pf10
Pseudomonas virus pf16
Pseudomonas virus Pf1ERZ2017
Pseudomonas virus Pf3
Pseudomonas virus PFP1
Pseudomonas virus phCDa
Pseudomonas virus phi12
Pseudomonas virus phi13
Pseudomonas virus Phi15
Pseudomonas virus phi2954
Pseudomonas virus phi3
Pseudomonas virus phi6
Pseudomonas virus phi8
Pseudomonas virus phiCTX
Pseudomonas virus phiKMV
Pseudomonas virus phiKZ
Pseudomonas virus phiMK
Pseudomonas virus phiNN
Pseudomonas virus PhiPsa17
Pseudomonas virus PhiPSA2
Pseudomonas virus PhiS1
Pseudomonas virus phiYY
Pseudomonas virus PM105
Pseudomonas virus PMBT3
Pseudomonas virus PMG1
Pseudomonas virus PMW
Pseudomonas virus PollyC
Pseudomonas virus PPPL1
Pseudomonas virus PPpW4
Pseudomonas virus PR4
Pseudomonas virus PRD1
Pseudomonas virus PS24
Pseudomonas virus PS44
Pseudomonas virus Psa374
Pseudomonas virus PspYZU08
Pseudomonas virus PT2
Pseudomonas virus PT5
Pseudomonas virus R18
Pseudomonas virus RLP
Pseudomonas virus shl2
Pseudomonas virus SL2
Pseudomonas virus SM1
Pseudomonas virus SN
Pseudomonas virus tabernarius
Pseudomonas virus tf
Pseudomonas virus TL
Pseudomonas virus UFVP2
Pseudomonas virus uligo
Pseudomonas virus UNOSLW1
Pseudomonas virus VCM
Pseudomonas virus VSW3
Pseudomonas virus WRT
Pseudomonas virus Yua
Pseudomonas virus Zigelbrucke
Pseudoplusia includens virus
Psimunavirus psiM2
Psipapillomavirus 1
Psipapillomavirus 2
Psipapillomavirus 3
Psittacid alphaherpesvirus 1
Psittaciform 1 orthobornavirus
Psittaciform 2 orthobornavirus
Psittacine atadenovirus A
Psittacine aviadenovirus B
Psittacine aviadenovirus C
Psittacinepox virus
Pteromalus puparum peropuvirus
Pteronotus davyi polyomavirus 1
Pteronotus parnellii polyomavirus 1
Pteropodid alphaherpesvirus 1
Pteropox virus
Pteropus associated gemycircularvirus 1
Pteropus associated gemycircularvirus 10
Pteropus associated gemycircularvirus 2
Pteropus associated gemycircularvirus 3
Pteropus associated gemycircularvirus 4
Pteropus associated gemycircularvirus 5
Pteropus associated gemycircularvirus 6
Pteropus associated gemycircularvirus 7
Pteropus associated gemycircularvirus 8
Pteropus associated gemycircularvirus 9
Pteropus associated gemygorvirus 1
Pteropus associated gemykibivirus 1
Pteropus associated gemykolovirus 1
Pteropus associated gemykolovirus 2
Pteropus vampyrus polyomavirus 1
Ptyasnivirus 1
Puerto Almendras almendravirus
Puma lentivirus
Pumpkin polerovirus
Pumpkin yellow mosaic virus
Punique phlebovirus
Punta Toro phlebovirus
Puumala orthohantavirus
Pygoscelis adeliae polyomavirus 1
Pyrobaculum filamentous virus 1
Pyrobaculum spherical virus
Pyrrhula pyrrhula polyomavirus 1

Q

Qalyub orthonairovirus
Qingling orthophasmavirus
Quail pea mosaic virus
Quailpox virus
Quaranfil quaranjavirus
Queensland carbovirus
Quezon mobatvirus

R

Rabbit associated gemykroznavirus 1
Rabbit fibroma virus
Rabbit hemorrhagic disease virus
Rabies lyssavirus
Rabovirus A
Rabovirus B
Rabovirus C
Rabovirus D
Raccoonpox virus
Radi vesiculovirus
Radish leaf curl virus
Radish mosaic virus
Radish yellow edge virus
Rafivirus A
Rafivirus B
Rafivirus C
Ralstonia virus Ap1
Ralstonia virus DURPI
Ralstonia virus ITL1
Ralstonia virus PE226
Ralstonia virus RP12
Ralstonia virus RPSC1
Ralstonia virus RS551
Ralstonia virus RS603
Ralstonia virus RSA1
Ralstonia virus RSB1
Ralstonia virus RSB2
Ralstonia virus RSB3
Ralstonia virus RSF1
Ralstonia virus RSJ2
Ralstonia virus RSJ5
Ralstonia virus RSL1
Ralstonia virus RSL2
Ralstonia virus RSM1
Ralstonia virus RSM3
Ralstonia virus RsoP1EGY
Ralstonia virus RsoP1IDN
Ralstonia virus RSPI1
Ralstonia virus RSPII1
Ralstonia virus RSS1
Ralstonia virus RSY1
Ramie mosaic Yunnan virus
Ranid herpesvirus 1
Ranid herpesvirus 2
Ranid herpesvirus 3
Ranunculus leaf distortion virus
Ranunculus mild mosaic virus
Ranunculus mosaic virus
Ranunculus white mottle ophiovirus
Raoultella virus RP180
Raphanus sativus chrysovirus
Raptor siadenovirus A
Raspberry bushy dwarf virus
Raspberry leaf blotch emaravirus
Raspberry leaf mottle virus
Raspberry ringspot virus
Raspberry vein chlorosis cytorhabdovirus
Rat associated gemycircularvirus 1
Rat associated porprismacovirus 1
Rattail cactus necrosis-associated virus
Rattus norvegicus polyomavirus 1
Rattus norvegicus polyomavirus 2
Raven circovirus
Recovirus A
Red clover associated luteovirus
Red clover cryptic virus 2
Red clover mottle virus
Red clover necrotic mosaic virus
Red clover vein mosaic virus
Red deerpox virus
Redbud yellow ringspot-associated emaravirus
Redspotted grouper nervous necrosis virus
Rehmannia mosaic virus
Rehmannia virus 1
Reptile sunshinevirus 1
Reptilian ferlavirus
Reptilian orthoreovirus
Reston ebolavirus
Reticuloendotheliosis virus
Rheinheimera virus Barba18A
Rheinheimera virus Barba19A
Rheinheimera virus Barba21A
Rheinheimera virus Barba5S
Rheinheimera virus Barba8S
Rhesus macaque simian foamy virus
Rhinolophus associated gemykibivirus 1
Rhinolophus associated gemykibivirus 2
Rhinolophus bat coronavirus HKU2
Rhinolophus ferrumequinum alphacoronavirus HuB-2013
Rhinovirus A
Rhinovirus B
Rhinovirus C
Rhizidiomyces virus
Rhizobium virus P106B
Rhizobium virus RHEph01
Rhizobium virus RHEph02
Rhizobium virus RHEph08
Rhizobium virus RHEph09
Rhizobium virus RHEph4
Rhizoctonia cerealis alphaendornavirus 1
Rhizoctonia magoulivirus 1
Rhizoctonia solani alphaendornavirus 2
Rhizoctonia solani virus 717
Rhizosolenia setigera RNA virus 01
Rhodobacter virus RcCronus
Rhodobacter virus RcSpartan
Rhodobacter virus RcTitan
Rhodococcus virus Pepy6
Rhodococcus virus Poco6
Rhodococcus virus RER2
Rhodococcus virus RGL3
Rhodococcus virus Trina
Rhodococcus virus Weasel
Rhododendron virus A
Rhopalanthe virus Y
Rhopalosiphum padi virus
Rhopapillomavirus 1
Rhopapillomavirus 2
Rhynchobatus djiddensis polyomavirus 1
Rhynchosia golden mosaic Havana virus
Rhynchosia golden mosaic Sinaloa virus
Rhynchosia golden mosaic virus
Rhynchosia mild mosaic virus
Rhynchosia rugose golden mosaic virus
Rhynchosia yellow mosaic betasatellite
Rhynchosia yellow mosaic India virus
Rhynchosia yellow mosaic virus
Ribes americanum virus A
Ribgrass mosaic virus
Rice black streaked dwarf virus
Rice dwarf virus
Rice gall dwarf virus
Rice grassy stunt tenuivirus
Rice hoja blanca tenuivirus
Rice latent virus 1
Rice latent virus 2
Rice necrosis mosaic virus
Rice ragged stunt virus
Rice stripe mosaic cytorhabdovirus
Rice stripe necrosis virus
Rice stripe tenuivirus
Rice tungro bacilliform virus
Rice tungro spherical virus
Rice yellow mottle virus
Rice yellow stunt alphanucleorhabdovirus
Rift Valley fever phlebovirus
Rinderpest morbillivirus
Rio Bravo virus
Rio Chico almendravirus
Rio Grande phlebovirus
Rio Negro virus
Rio Preto da Eva pacuvirus
Riverside ohlsrhavirus
Rochambeau curiovirus
Rockport orthohantavirus
Rodent associated circovirus 1
Rodent associated circovirus 2
Rodent associated circovirus 3
Rodent associated circovirus 4
Rodent associated circovirus 5
Rodent associated circovirus 6
Rodent associated circovirus 7
Rodent associated cyclovirus 1
Rodent associated cyclovirus 2
Rodent bocaparvovirus 1
Rodent bocaparvovirus 2
Rodent chaphamaparvovirus 1
Rodent chaphamaparvovirus 2
Rodent dependoparvovirus 1
Rodent dependoparvovirus 2
Rodent erythroparvovirus 1
Rodent protoparvovirus 1
Rodent protoparvovirus 2
Rodent protoparvovirus 3
Rohelivirus A
Rosa rugosa leaf distortion virus
Rosavirus A
Rosavirus B
Rosavirus C
Rose leaf curl betasatellite
Rose leaf curl virus
Rose leaf rosette-associated virus
Rose rosette emaravirus
Rose spring dwarf-associated virus
Rose yellow mosaic virus
Rose yellow vein virus
Rosellinia necatrix betaendornavirus 1
Rosellinia necatrix megabirnavirus 1
Rosellinia necatrix partitivirus 2
Rosellinia necatrix quadrivirus 1
Rosellinia necatrix victorivirus 1
Rosellinia necatrix virus 1
Roseobacter virus RDJL1
Roseobacter virus RDJL2
Roseobacter virus SIO1
Ross River virus
Rotavirus A
Rotavirus B
Rotavirus C
Rotavirus D
Rotavirus F
Rotavirus G
Rotavirus H
Rotavirus I
Rotavirus J
Rotifer birnavirus
Rottboellia yellow mottle virus
Rotterdam reptarenavirus
Roundleaf bat hepatitis B virus
Rous sarcoma virus
Rousettus aegyptiacus polyomavirus 1
Rousettus bat coronavirus GCCDC1
Rousettus bat coronavirus HKU9
Royal Farm virus
Rubella virus
Rubus canadensis virus 1
Rubus yellow net virus
Rudbeckia flower distortion virus
Rukutama uukuvirus
Ryegrass cryptic virus
Ryegrass mosaic virus
Ryegrass mottle virus
Ryukyu mammarenavirus

S

Sabo orthobunyavirus
Saboya virus
Sacbrood virus
Saccharomyces 20S RNA narnavirus
Saccharomyces 23S RNA narnavirus
Saccharomyces cerevisiae Ty1 virus
Saccharomyces cerevisiae Ty2 virus
Saccharomyces cerevisiae Ty3 virus
Saccharomyces cerevisiae Ty4 virus
Saccharomyces cerevisiae Ty5 virus
Saccharomyces cerevisiae virus L-A
Saccharomyces cerevisiae virus LBCLa
Saccharum streak virus
Saffron latent virus
Saguaro cactus virus
Saguinine gammaherpesvirus 1
Saimiri boliviensis polyomavirus 1
Saimiri sciureus polyomavirus 1
Saimiriine alphaherpesvirus 1
Saimiriine betaherpesvirus 4
Saimiriine gammaherpesvirus 2
Saint Floris phlebovirus
Saint Louis encephalitis virus
Saint Valerien virus
Sakhalin orthonairovirus
Sakobuvirus A
Sal Vieja virus
Salanga phlebovirus
Salehabad phlebovirus
Salem salemvirus
Salinibacter virus M1EM1
Salinibacter virus M31CR41-2
Salinibacter virus M8CC19
Salinibacter virus M8CR30-2
Salinibacter virus M8CRM1
Salinibacter virus SRUTV1
Salinivibrio virus SMHB1
Salivirus A
Salmo aquaparamyxovirus
Salmon gillpox virus
Salmon isavirus
Salmon pancreas disease virus
Salmonella virus 118970sal2
Salmonella virus 123
Salmonella virus 329
Salmonella virus 36
Salmonella virus 38
Salmonella virus 3A8767
Salmonella virus 9NA
Salmonella virus AG11
Salmonella virus BP12A
Salmonella virus BP12B
Salmonella virus BP63
Salmonella virus BPS15Q2
Salmonella virus BPS17L1
Salmonella virus BPS17W1
Salmonella virus BSP161
Salmonella virus BTP1
Salmonella virus Chi
Salmonella virus Det7
Salmonella virus Ent1
Salmonella virus Epsilon15
Salmonella virus f18SE
Salmonella virus FelixO1
Salmonella virus Fels2
Salmonella virus FSL SP-058
Salmonella virus FSL SP-076
Salmonella virus FSLSP004
Salmonella virus FSLSP030
Salmonella virus FSLSP088
Salmonella virus GG32
Salmonella virus iEPS5
Salmonella virus IKe
Salmonella virus Jersey
Salmonella virus L13
Salmonella virus LSPA1
Salmonella virus Lumpael
Salmonella virus LVR16A
Salmonella virus Marshall
Salmonella virus Maynard
Salmonella virus Melville
Salmonella virus Mushroom
Salmonella virus NR01
Salmonella virus P22
Salmonella virus PHB07
Salmonella virus phSE2
Salmonella virus PM10
Salmonella virus PsP3
Salmonella virus PVPSE1
Salmonella virus RE2010
Salmonella virus S113
Salmonella virus S114
Salmonella virus S116
Salmonella virus S124
Salmonella virus S126
Salmonella virus S131
Salmonella virus S132
Salmonella virus S133
Salmonella virus S147
Salmonella virus S16
Salmonella virus Sasha
Salmonella virus SE1Kor
Salmonella virus SE1Spa
Salmonella virus SE2
Salmonella virus Seafire
Salmonella virus SEN1
Salmonella virus SEN34
Salmonella virus SEN4
Salmonella virus SEN8
Salmonella virus SETP13
Salmonella virus SETP3
Salmonella virus SETP7
Salmonella virus SFP10
Salmonella virus SG-JL2
Salmonella virus SH19
Salmonella virus SH9
Salmonella virus Shivani
Salmonella virus Si3
Salmonella virus SJ2
Salmonella virus SJ3
Salmonella virus SJ46
Salmonella virus SKML39
Salmonella virus SopEphi
Salmonella virus SP01
Salmonella virus SP069
Salmonella virus SP101
Salmonella virus SP116
Salmonella virus SP126
Salmonella virus SP3
Salmonella virus SP31
Salmonella virus SP6
Salmonella virus SPC35
Salmonella virus SPN19
Salmonella virus SPN1S
Salmonella virus SPN3US
Salmonella virus Spp16
Salmonella virus SS3e
Salmonella virus SSE121
Salmonella virus ST64T
Salmonella virus STG2
Salmonella virus Stitch
Salmonella virus STML131
Salmonella virus STML198
Salmonella virus STP4a
Salmonella virus Sw2
Salmonella virus UAB87
Salmonella virus Vi06
Salmonella virus ViI
Salmonella virus wksl3
Salmonella virus YSP2
Salmonella virus ZCSE2
Salmonid herpesvirus 1
Salmonid herpesvirus 2
Salmonid herpesvirus 3
Salmonid novirhabdovirus
Salmonlouse caligrhavirus
Salobo phlabovirus
Salterprovirus His1
Sambucus virus C
Sambucus virus D
Sambucus virus E
San Angelo orthobunyavirus
San Perlita virus
Sanfarnavirus 1
Sanfarnavirus 2
Sanfarnavirus 3
Sangassou orthohantavirus
Sango orthobunyavirus
Santabarbara arurhavirus
Santee-Cooper ranavirus
Sanxia mivirus
Sanxia sawastrivirus
Sanxia yingvirus
Sapelovirus A
Sapelovirus B
Sapporo virus
Sarcochilus virus Y
Satsuma dwarf virus
Saumarez Reef virus
Sauropus leaf curl virus
Sawgrass sawgrhavirus
Scale drop disease virus
Scallion mosaic virus
Scapularis ixovirus
Scheffersomyces segobiensis virus L
Schefflera ringspot virus
Schistocerca gregaria entomopoxvirus
Schistosoma semotivirus Sinbad
Schizosaccharomyces pombe Tf1 virus
Schizosaccharomyces pombe Tf2 virus
Schlumbergera virus X
Schmallenberg orthobunyavirus
Schmidt uukuvirus
Schoolhouse hartmanivirus
Sclerotinia botoulivirus 2
Sclerotinia deltaflexivirus 1
Sclerotinia gemycircularvirus 1
Sclerotinia minor betaendornavirus 1
Sclerotinia sclerotimonavirus
Sclerotinia sclerotiorum betaendornavirus 1
Sclerotinia sclerotiorum debilitation-associated RNA virus
Sclerotinia scleroulivirus 1
Scoliodon scoliodonvirus
Scotophilus bat coronavirus 512
Scrophularia mottle virus
Sea lion mastadenovirus A
Sea otterpox virus
Sea trout perhabdovirus
Sectovirus 1
Seewis orhtohantavirus
Semliki Forest virus
Sena Madureira sripuvirus
Senecavirus A
Senecio yellow mosaic virus
Senegalvirus marseillevirus
Senna leaf curl virus
Seoul orthohantavirus
Sepik virus
Serinus canaria polyomavirus 1
Serra do Navio mammarenavirus 
Serra do Navio orthobunyavirus
Serratia virus 2050H2
Serratia virus BF
Serratia virus CHI14
Serratia virus IME250
Serratia virus MAM1
Serratia virus SM9-3Y
Sesame curly top virus
Sesbania mosaic virus
Severe acute respiratory syndrome–related coronavirus
Sewage derived gemycircularvirus 1
Sewage derived gemycircularvirus 2
Sewage derived gemycircularvirus 3
Sewage derived gemycircularvirus 4
Sewage derived gemycircularvirus 5
Sewage derived gemygorvirus 1
Sewage derived gemykibivirus 1
Sewage derived gemykibivirus 2
Sewage derived gemykrogvirus 1
Shahe yingvirus
Shahe yuyuevirus
Shallot latent virus
Shallot virus X
Shallot yellow stripe virus
Shanbavirus A
Sharpbelly cultervirus
Shayang mivirus
Sheep associated gemycircularvirus 1
Sheep associated porprismacovirus 1
Sheep associated porprismacovirus 2
Sheep associated porprismacovirus 3
Sheeppox virus
Shewanella virus Spp001
Shewanella virus SppYZU05
Shigella virus 008
Shigella virus 7502Stx
Shigella virus A7
Shigella virus AG3
Shigella virus Buco
Shigella virus EP23
Shigella virus ISF001
Shigella virus ISF002
Shigella virus POCJ13
Shigella virus pSf1
Shigella virus PSf2
Shigella virus Pss1
Shigella virus Sb1
Shigella virus Sd1
Shigella virus Sf12
Shigella virus Sf13
Shigella virus Sf14
Shigella virus Sf17
Shigella virus Sf21
Shigella virus Sf22
Shigella virus Sf24
Shigella virus Sf6
Shigella virus Sfin1
Shigella virus SfMu
Shigella virus SFN6B
Shigella virus SFPH2
Shigella virus SH6
Shigella virus SHBML501
Shigella virus Shfl1
Shigella virus Shfl2
Shigella virus SHSML45
Shigella virus SHSML521
Shigella virus SP18
Shigella virus SSP1
Shigella virus UTAM
Shigella virus VASD
Shimoni bat lyssavirus
Shingleback nidovirus 1
Shrimp wenrivirus
Shuangao anphevirus
Shuangao insect virus 8
Shuangao insect-associated chrysovirus
Shuni orthobunyavirus
Sicilian phlebovirus
Sicinivirus A
Sida angular mosaic virus
Sida bright yellow mosaic virus
Sida chlorotic mottle virus
Sida chlorotic vein virus
Sida ciliaris golden mosaic virus
Sida common mosaic virus
Sida Cuba alphasatellite
Sida golden mosaic Braco virus
Sida golden mosaic Brazil virus
Sida golden mosaic Buckup virus
Sida golden mosaic Costa Rica virus
Sida golden mosaic Florida virus
Sida golden mosaic Lara virus
Sida golden mosaic virus
Sida golden mottle virus
Sida golden yellow spot virus
Sida golden yellow vein deltasatellite 1
Sida golden yellow vein deltasatellite 2
Sida golden yellow vein deltasatellite 3
Sida golden yellow vein virus
Sida leaf curl alphasatellite
Sida leaf curl virus
Sida micrantha mosaic virus
Sida mosaic Alagoas virus
Sida mosaic Bolivia virus 1
Sida mosaic Bolivia virus 2
Sida mosaic Sinaloa virus
Sida mottle Alagoas virus
Sida mottle virus
Sida yellow blotch virus
Sida yellow leaf curl virus
Sida yellow mosaic Alagoas virus
Sida yellow mosaic China virus
Sida yellow mosaic virus
Sida yellow mosaic Yucatan virus
Sida yellow mottle virus
Sida yellow net virus
Sida yellow vein Vietnam alphasatellite
Sida yellow vein Vietnam virus
Sida yellow vein virus
Sidastrum golden leaf spot virus
Siegesbeckia yellow vein betasatellite
Siegesbeckia yellow vein Guangxi virus
Siegesbeckia yellow vein virus
Sieqvirus S42C7
Sierra Nevada nyavirus
Sigmapapillomavirus 1
Silverwater uukuvirus
Simbu orthobunyavirus
Simian immunodeficiency virus
Simian mastadenovirus A
Simian mastadenovirus B
Simian mastadenovirus C
Simian mastadenovirus D
Simian mastadenovirus E
Simian mastadenovirus F
Simian mastadenovirus G
Simian mastadenovirus H
Simian mastadenovirus I
Simian orthorubulavirus
Sin Nombre orthohantavirus
Sindbis virus
Singapore grouper iridovirus
Sinorhizobium virus M12
Sinorhizobium virus M7
Sinorhizobium virus N3
Sint-Jan onion latent virus
Sipunculid berhavirus
Sitke waterborne virus
Skua siadenovirus A
Skunk mastadenovirus A
Skunkpox virus
Slow bee paralysis virus
Small ruminant morbillivirus
Snail associated protobacilladnavirus 1
Snail associated protobacilladnavirus 2
Snake atadenovirus A
Snakehead novirhabdovirus
Snowshoe hare orthobunyavirus
Snyder-Theilen feline sarcoma virus
Sodalis virus SO1
Soil-borne cereal mosaic virus
Soil-borne wheat mosaic virus
Solanum mosaic Bolivia virus
Solanum nodiflorum mottle virus
Solanum tuberosum Tst1 virus
Solenopsis invicta virus 1
Solenopsis invicta virus 2
Solenopsis invicta virus 3
Solenopsis invicta virus 4
Solwezi mammarenavirus
Sonchus cytorhabdovirus 1
Sonchus yellow net betanucleorhabdovirus
Sophora yellow stunt alphasatellite 1
Sophora yellow stunt alphasatellite 2
Sophora yellow stunt alphasatellite 3
Sophora yellow stunt alphasatellite 4
Sophora yellow stunt alphasatellite 5
Sorex araneus coronavirus T14
Sorex araneus polyomavirus 1
Sorex coronatus polyomavirus 1
Sorex minutus polyomavirus 1
Sorghum chlorotic spot virus
Sorghum mosaic virus
Sororoca orthobunyavirus
Sosuga pararubulavirus
Souris mammarenavirus
South African cassava mosaic virus
Southern bean mosaic virus
Southern cowpea mosaic virus
Southern elephant seal virus
Southern rice black-streaked dwarf virus
Southern tomato virus
Southwest carbovirus
Sowbane mosaic virus
Sowthistle yellow vein betanucleorhabdovirus
Soybean associated gemycircularvirus 1
Soybean blistering mosaic virus
Soybean chlorotic blotch virus
Soybean chlorotic mottle virus
Soybean cyst nematode socyvirus
Soybean dwarf virus
Soybean latent spherical virus
Soybean mild mottle virus
Soybean mosaic virus
Soybean Putnam virus
Soybean scleroulivirus 1
Soybean scleroulivirus 2
Soybean vein necrosis orthotospovirus
Soybean yellow common mosaic virus
Soybean yellow mottle mosaic virus
Soybean-associated deltaflexivirus 1
Sparrowpox virus
Spartina mottle virus
Sparus aurata polyomavirus 1
Sphaeropsis sapinea RNA virus 1
Sphaeropsis sapinea RNA virus 2
Spheniscid alphaherpesvirus 1
Sphingobium virus Lacusarx
Sphingomonas virus Scott
Spider associated cyclovirus 1
Spider monkey simian foamy virus
Spider shaspivirus
Spikefish actinovirus
Spilanthes yellow vein virus
Spinach amalgavirus 1
Spinach curly top Arizona virus
Spinach latent virus
Spinach severe curly top virus
Spinach temperate virus
Spinach yellow vein virus
Spiraea yellow leafspot virus
Spiranthes mosaic virus 3
Spiroplasma virus C74
Spiroplasma virus R8A2B
Spiroplasma virus SkV1CR23x
Spiroplasma virus SpV4
Spiroplasma virus SVTS2
Spodoptera eridania nucleopolyhedrovirus
Spodoptera exempta nucleopolyhedrovirus
Spodoptera exigua iflavirus 1
Spodoptera exigua iflavirus 2
Spodoptera exigua multiple nucleopolyhedrovirus
Spodoptera frugiperda ascovirus 1a
Spodoptera frugiperda granulovirus
Spodoptera frugiperda multiple nucleopolyhedrovirus
Spodoptera littoralis nucleopolyhedrovirus
Spodoptera litura granulovirus
Spodoptera litura nucleopolyhedrovirus
Sporobolus striate mosaic virus 1
Sporobolus striate mosaic virus 2
Spring beauty latent virus
Squamate dependoparvovirus 1
Squamate dependoparvovirus 2
Squash chlorotic leaf spot virus
Squash leaf curl China virus
Squash leaf curl Philippines virus
Squash leaf curl virus
Squash leaf curl Yunnan virus
Squash mild leaf curl virus
Squash mosaic virus
Squash vein yellowing virus
Squirrel associated cyclovirus 1
Squirrel fibroma virus
Squirrel mastadenovirus A
Squirrel monkey retrovirus
Squirrel monkey simian foamy virus
Squirrel respirovirus
Squirrelpox virus
Sri Lankan cassava mosaic virus
Sripur sripuvirus
St Croix River virus
Stachytarpheta leaf curl virus
Staphylococcus virus 108PVL
Staphylococcus virus 11
Staphylococcus virus 13
Staphylococcus virus 187
Staphylococcus virus 2638A
Staphylococcus virus 29
Staphylococcus virus 37
Staphylococcus virus 3a
Staphylococcus virus 42e
Staphylococcus virus 44AHJD
Staphylococcus virus 47
Staphylococcus virus 52a
Staphylococcus virus 53
Staphylococcus virus 55
Staphylococcus virus 66
Staphylococcus virus 69
Staphylococcus virus 71
Staphylococcus virus 77
Staphylococcus virus 80
Staphylococcus virus 80alpha
Staphylococcus virus 85
Staphylococcus virus 88
Staphylococcus virus 92
Staphylococcus virus 96
Staphylococcus virus Andhra
Staphylococcus virus BP39
Staphylococcus virus BS1
Staphylococcus virus BS2
Staphylococcus virus CNPH82
Staphylococcus virus CSA13
Staphylococcus virus EW
Staphylococcus virus G1
Staphylococcus virus G15
Staphylococcus virus GRCS
Staphylococcus virus IPLA35
Staphylococcus virus IPLA5
Staphylococcus virus IPLA7
Staphylococcus virus IPLA88
Staphylococcus virus IPLAC1C
Staphylococcus virus JD7
Staphylococcus virus K
Staphylococcus virus MCE2014
Staphylococcus virus P108
Staphylococcus virus Pabna
Staphylococcus virus PH15
Staphylococcus virus phi12
Staphylococcus virus phiAGO13
Staphylococcus virus phiETA
Staphylococcus virus phiETA2
Staphylococcus virus phiETA3
Staphylococcus virus phiMR11
Staphylococcus virus phiMR25
Staphylococcus virus phiNM1
Staphylococcus virus phiNM2
Staphylococcus virus phiNM4
Staphylococcus virus phiSLT
Staphylococcus virus PSa3
Staphylococcus virus QT1
Staphylococcus virus Remus
Staphylococcus virus Rodi
Staphylococcus virus S24-1
Staphylococcus virus S25-4
Staphylococcus virus S253
Staphylococcus virus SA11
Staphylococcus virus SA12
Staphylococcus virus SAP2
Staphylococcus virus SAP26
Staphylococcus virus Sb1
Staphylococcus virus SCH1
Staphylococcus virus SEP1
Staphylococcus virus SEP9
Staphylococcus virus Sextaec
Staphylococcus virus SLPW
Staphylococcus virus SscM1
Staphylococcus virus St134
Staphylococcus virus Stau2
Staphylococcus virus Twort
Staphylococcus virus X2
Starling associated gemygorvirus 1
Starling circovirus
Starlingpox virus
Stenotrophomonas virus DLP5
Stenotrophomonas virus IME13
Stenotrophomonas virus IME15
Stenotrophomonas virus PSH1
Stenotrophomonas virus SMA6
Stenotrophomonas virus SMA7
Stenotrophomonas virus SMA9
Stenotrophomonas virus Smp131
Stocky prune virus
Stopalavirus S38C3
Strawberry chlorotic fleck-associated virus
Strawberry crinkle cytorhabdovirus
Strawberry latent ringspot virus
Strawberry mild yellow edge virus
Strawberry mottle virus
Strawberry necrotic shock virus
Strawberry pallidosis-associated virus
Strawberry pseudo mild yellow edge virus
Strawberry vein banding virus
Strepomyces virus Drgrey
Strepomyces virus Rima
Streptocarpus flower break virus
Streptococcus virus 2972
Streptococcus virus 7201
Streptococcus virus 858
Streptococcus virus ALQ132
Streptococcus virus C1
Streptococcus virus Cp1
Streptococcus virus Cp7
Streptococcus virus DT1
Streptococcus virus O1205
Streptococcus virus phiAbc2
Streptococcus virus Sfi11
Streptococcus virus Sfi19
Streptococcus virus Sfi21
Streptococcus virus SPQS1
Streptomyces virus Aaronocolus
Streptomyces virus AbbeyMikolon
Streptomyces virus Amela
Streptomyces virus Attoomi
Streptomyces virus Austintatious
Streptomyces virus Bing
Streptomyces virus Caliburn
Streptomyces virus Danzina
Streptomyces virus Darolandstone
Streptomyces virus ELB20
Streptomyces virus Hiyaa
Streptomyces virus Hydra
Streptomyces virus Ididsumtinwong
Streptomyces virus Izzy
Streptomyces virus Jay2Jay
Streptomyces virus Lannister
Streptomyces virus Lika
Streptomyces virus Lilbooboo
Streptomyces virus Mildred21
Streptomyces virus NootNoot
Streptomyces virus PapayaSalad
Streptomyces virus Paradiddles
Streptomyces virus Peebs
Streptomyces virus phiBT1
Streptomyces virus phiC31
Streptomyces virus phiCAM
Streptomyces virus phiHau3
Streptomyces virus Picard
Streptomyces virus R4
Streptomyces virus Raleigh
Streptomyces virus Rowa
Streptomyces virus Samisti12
Streptomyces virus Scap1
Streptomyces virus Sujidade
Streptomyces virus TG1
Streptomyces virus TP1604
Streptomyces virus Vash
Streptomyces virus YDN12
Streptomyces virus Zemlya
Striated antennavirus
Strider striwavirus
Striped jack nervous necrosis virus
Stupnyavirus KM16C193
Sturgeon ichtadenovirus A
Sturnira lilium polyomavirus 1
Suakwa aphid-borne yellows virus
Subterranean clover mottle virus
Subterranean clover stunt alphasatellite 1
Subterranean clover stunt alphasatellite 2
Subterranean clover stunt virus
Sucra jujuba nucleopolyhedrovirus
Sudan ebolavirus
Sudan watermelon mosaic virus
Suffolk mivirus
Sugarcane bacilliform Guadeloupe A virus
Sugarcane bacilliform Guadeloupe D virus
Sugarcane bacilliform IM virus
Sugarcane bacilliform MO virus
Sugarcane chlorotic streak virus
Sugarcane mosaic virus
Sugarcane streak Egypt virus
Sugarcane streak mosaic virus
Sugarcane streak Reunion virus
Sugarcane streak virus
Sugarcane striate mosaic-associated virus
Sugarcane striate virus
Sugarcane white streak virus
Sugarcane yellow leaf virus
Suid alphaherpesvirus 1
Suid betaherpesvirus 2
Suid gammaherpesvirus 3
Suid gammaherpesvirus 4
Suid gammaherpesvirus 5
Sulfolobus alphaportoglobovirus 1
Sulfolobus ellipsoid virus 1
Sulfolobus islandicus filamentous virus
Sulfolobus islandicus rod-shaped virus 1
Sulfolobus islandicus rod-shaped virus 2
Sulfolobus newzealandicus droplet-shaped virus
Sulfolobus spindle-shaped virus 1
Sulfolobus spindle-shaped virus 2
Sulfolobus spindle-shaped virus 4
Sulfolobus spindle-shaped virus 5
Sulfolobus spindle-shaped virus 6
Sulfolobus spindle-shaped virus 7
Sulfolobus spindle-shaped virus 8
Sulfolobus spindle-shaped virus 9
Sulfolobus turreted icosahedral virus 1
Sulfolobus turreted icosahedral virus 2
Suncus murinus coronavirus X74
Sunflower chlorotic mottle virus
Sunflower leaf curl Karnataka alphasatellite
Sunflower mild mosaic virus
Sunflower mosaic virus
Sunflower ring blotch virus
Sunguru sunrhavirus
Sunn hemp leaf distortion virus
Sunn-hemp mosaic virus
Swan circovirus
Sweet clover necrotic mosaic virus
Sweet potato C6 virus
Sweet potato chlorotic fleck virus
Sweet potato chlorotic stunt virus
Sweet potato collusive virus
Sweet potato feathery mottle virus
Sweet potato golden vein Korea virus
Sweet potato latent virus
Sweet potato leaf curl Canary virus
Sweet potato leaf curl China virus
Sweet potato leaf curl deltasatellite 1
Sweet potato leaf curl deltasatellite 2
Sweet potato leaf curl deltasatellite 3
Sweet potato leaf curl Georgia virus
Sweet potato leaf curl Guangxi virus
Sweet potato leaf curl Henan virus
Sweet potato leaf curl Hubei virus
Sweet potato leaf curl Sao Paulo virus
Sweet potato leaf curl Shandong virus
Sweet potato leaf curl Sichuan virus 1
Sweet potato leaf curl Sichuan virus 2
Sweet potato leaf curl South Carolina virus
Sweet potato leaf curl virus
Sweet potato leaf speckling virus
Sweet potato mild mottle virus
Sweet potato mild speckling virus
Sweet potato mosaic virus
Sweet potato pakakuy virus
Sweet potato symptomless virus 1
Sweet potato vein clearing virus
Sweet potato virus 2
Sweet potato virus C
Sweet potato virus G
Sweetwater Branch tibrovirus
Swinepox virus
Switchgrass mosaic-associated virus
Symapivirus A
Synechoccus virus SP4
Synechococcus STIP37
Synechococcus virus AC2014fSyn7803C8
Synechococcus virus ACG2014bSyn7803C61
Synechococcus virus ACG2014bSyn9311C4
Synechococcus virus ACG2014f
Synechococcus virus ACG2014fSyn7803US26
Synechococcus virus Bellamy
Synechococcus virus P60
Synechococcus virus PSSP2
Synechococcus virus SB28
Synechococcus virus SCAM1
Synechococcus virus SCAM3
Synechococcus virus SCAM7
Synechococcus virus SCAM9
Synechococcus virus SCBP2
Synechococcus virus SCBP3
Synechococcus virus SCBP4
Synechococcus virus SCBP42
Synechococcus virus SCBWM1
Synechococcus virus SIOM18
Synechococcus virus SMbCM100
Synechococcus virus SMbCM6
Synechococcus virus SPM2
Synechococcus virus SRIM12-01
Synechococcus virus SRIM12-06
Synechococcus virus SRIM12-08
Synechococcus virus SRIM2
Synechococcus virus SRIM44
Synechococcus virus SRIM50
Synechococcus virus SRIM8
Synechococcus virus SRIP1
Synechococcus virus SRIP2
Synechococcus virus SShM2
Synechococcus virus SSKS1
Synechococcus virus SSM1
Synechococcus virus ST4
Synechococcus virus STIM4
Synechococcus virus STIM5
Synechococcus virus SWAM2
Synechococcus virus Syn19
Synechococcus virus Syn30
Synechococcus virus Syn5
Synedrella leaf curl alphasatellite
Synedrella yellow vein clearing virus
Synetaeris tenuifemur ichnovirus
Syngnathid ichthamaparvovirus 1
Synodus synodonvirus

T

Tacaiuma orthobunyavirus
Tacaribe mammarenavirus
Tacheng arlivirus
Tacheng uukuvirus
Tahyna orthobunyavirus
Tai Forest coltivirus
Tai Forest ebolavirus
Tai Forest hepatitis B virus
Tai herbevirus
Tailam jeilongvirus
Taiwan bat lyssavirus
Taiwanese macaque simian foamy virus
Taiyuan mivirus
Takifugu rubripes Sushi virus
Takifugu rubripes Suzu virus
Tall oatgrass mosaic virus
Tamarillo leaf malformation virus
Tamdy orthonairovirus
Tamiami mammarenavirus
Tamus red mosaic virus
Tanapox virus
Tapara phlebovirus
Tapeworm tapwovirus
Tapirape pacuvirus
Taro bacilliform CH virus
Taro bacilliform virus
Taro vein chlorosis alphanucleorhabdovirus
Tarumizu coltivirus
Tataguine orthobunyavirus
Taterapox virus
Taupapillomavirus 1
Taupapillomavirus 2
Taupapillomavirus 3
Taupapillomavirus 4
Taura syndrome virus
Tea plant necrotic ring blotch virus
Tehran phlebovirus
Telfairia golden mosaic virus
Telfairia mosaic virus
Tellina virus
Tellina virus 1
Telosma mosaic virus
Tembusu virus
Tensaw orthobunyavirus
Tent-making bat hepatitis B virus
Teschovirus A
Teschovirus B
Testudine orthoreovirus
Testudinid alphaherpesvirus 3
Tete orthobunyavirus
Tetrasphaera virus TJE1
Tetterwort vein chlorosis virus
Teviot pararubulavirus
Thailand orthohantavirus
Thermoproteus tenax spherical virus 1
Thermoproteus tenax virus 1
Thermus virus IN93
Thermus virus OH3
Thermus virus P23-45
Thermus virus P23-77
Thermus virus P74-26
Thetaarterivirus kafuba
Thetaarterivirus mikelba 1
Thetapapillomavirus 1
Thiafora orthonairovirus
Thimiri orthobunyavirus
Thin paspalum asymptomatic virus
Thistle mottle virus
Thogoto thogotovirus
Thosea asigna virus
Thottopalayam thottimvirus
Thunberg fritillary mosaic virus
Thysanoplusia orichalcea nucleopolyhedrovirus
Tibetan frog hepatitis B virus
Tibrogargan tibrovirus
Tick associated circovirus 1
Tick associated circovirus 2
Tick-borne encephalitis virus
Tico phebovirus
Tiger puffer nervous necrosis virus
Tigray orthohantavirus
Tilapia tilapinevirus
Timboteua orthobunyavirus
Tioman pararubulavirus
Tobacco albetovirus 1
Tobacco albetovirus 2
Tobacco albetovirus 3
Tobacco bushy top virus
Tobacco curly shoot alphasatellite
Tobacco curly shoot betasatellite
Tobacco curly shoot virus
Tobacco etch virus
Tobacco latent virus
Tobacco leaf curl betasatellite
Tobacco leaf curl Comoros virus
Tobacco leaf curl Cuba virus
Tobacco leaf curl Dominican Republic virus
Tobacco leaf curl Japan betasatellite
Tobacco leaf curl Patna betasatellite
Tobacco leaf curl Pusa virus
Tobacco leaf curl Thailand virus
Tobacco leaf curl Yunnan virus
Tobacco leaf curl Zimbabwe virus
Tobacco leaf rugose virus
Tobacco mild green mosaic virus
Tobacco mosaic virus
Tobacco mosqueado virus
Tobacco mottle leaf curl virus
Tobacco mottle virus
Tobacco necrosis virus A
Tobacco necrosis virus D
Tobacco necrotic dwarf virus
Tobacco rattle virus
Tobacco ringspot virus
Tobacco streak virus
Tobacco vein banding mosaic virus
Tobacco vein clearing virus
Tobacco vein distorting virus
Tobacco vein mottling virus
Tobacco virtovirus 1
Tobacco virus 1
Tobacco yellow crinkle virus
Tobacco yellow dwarf virus
Tolypocladium cylindrosporum virus 1
Tomato apical stunt viroid
Tomato aspermy virus
Tomato black ring virus
Tomato blistering mosaic tymovirus
Tomato bright yellow mosaic virus
Tomato bright yellow mottle virus
Tomato brown rugose fruit virus
Tomato bushy stunt virus
Tomato chino La Paz virus
Tomato chlorosis virus
Tomato chlorotic dwarf viroid
Tomato chlorotic leaf curl virus
Tomato chlorotic leaf distortion virus
Tomato chlorotic mottle Guyane virus
Tomato chlorotic mottle virus
Tomato chlorotic spot orthotospovirus
Tomato common mosaic virus
Tomato curly stunt virus
Tomato dwarf leaf virus
Tomato enation leaf curl virus
Tomato golden leaf distortion virus
Tomato golden leaf spot virus
Tomato golden mosaic virus
Tomato golden mottle virus
Tomato golden vein virus
Tomato infectious chlorosis virus
Tomato interveinal chlorosis virus
Tomato latent virus
Tomato leaf curl Anjouan virus
Tomato leaf curl Arusha virus
Tomato leaf curl Bangalore betasatellite
Tomato leaf curl Bangalore virus
Tomato leaf curl Bangladesh betasatellite
Tomato leaf curl Bangladesh virus
Tomato leaf curl betasatellite
Tomato leaf curl Buea alphasatellite
Tomato leaf curl Burkina Faso virus
Tomato leaf curl Cameroon alphasatellite
Tomato leaf curl Cebu virus
Tomato leaf curl China betasatellite
Tomato leaf curl China virus
Tomato leaf curl Comoros virus
Tomato leaf curl deltasatellite
Tomato leaf curl Diana virus
Tomato leaf curl Gandhinagar betasatellite
Tomato leaf curl Ghana virus
Tomato leaf curl Guangdong virus
Tomato leaf curl Guangxi virus
Tomato leaf curl Gujarat virus
Tomato leaf curl Hainan virus
Tomato leaf curl Hanoi virus
Tomato leaf curl Hsinchu virus
Tomato leaf curl Iran virus
Tomato leaf curl Japan virus
Tomato leaf curl Java betasatellite
Tomato leaf curl Java virus
Tomato leaf curl Joydebpur betasatellite
Tomato leaf curl Joydebpur virus
Tomato leaf curl Karnataka virus
Tomato leaf curl Karnataka virus 2
Tomato leaf curl Karnataka virus 3
Tomato leaf curl Kerala virus
Tomato leaf curl Laguna betasatellite
Tomato leaf curl Laos betasatellite
Tomato leaf curl Laos virus
Tomato leaf curl Liwa virus
Tomato leaf curl Madagascar virus
Tomato leaf curl Mahe virus
Tomato leaf curl Malaysia betasatellite
Tomato leaf curl Malaysia virus
Tomato leaf curl Mali virus
Tomato leaf curl Mindanao virus
Tomato leaf curl Moheli virus
Tomato leaf curl Namakely virus
Tomato leaf curl Nepal betasatellite
Tomato leaf curl New Delhi alphasatellite
Tomato leaf curl New Delhi virus
Tomato leaf curl New Delhi virus 2
Tomato leaf curl New Delhi virus 4
Tomato leaf curl New Delhi virus 5
Tomato leaf curl Nigeria virus
Tomato leaf curl Pakistan alphasatellite
Tomato leaf curl Palampur virus
Tomato leaf curl Patna betasatellite
Tomato leaf curl Patna virus
Tomato leaf curl Philippine betasatellite
Tomato leaf curl Philippines virus
Tomato leaf curl Pune virus
Tomato leaf curl purple vein virus
Tomato leaf curl Rajasthan virus
Tomato leaf curl Seychelles virus
Tomato leaf curl Sinaloa virus
Tomato leaf curl Sri Lanka betasatellite
Tomato leaf curl Sri Lanka virus
Tomato leaf curl Sudan virus
Tomato leaf curl Sulawesi virus
Tomato leaf curl Taiwan virus
Tomato leaf curl Tanzania virus
Tomato leaf curl Toliara virus
Tomato leaf curl Uganda virus
Tomato leaf curl Vietnam virus
Tomato leaf curl Virudhunagar alphasatellite
Tomato leaf curl virus
Tomato leaf curl Yemen betasatellite
Tomato leaf deformation virus
Tomato leaf distortion virus
Tomato marchitez virus
Tomato mild mosaic virus
Tomato mild mottle virus
Tomato mild yellow leaf curl Aragua virus
Tomato mosaic Havana virus
Tomato mosaic virus
Tomato mottle leaf curl virus
Tomato mottle mosaic virus
Tomato mottle Taino virus
Tomato mottle virus
Tomato mottle wrinkle virus
Tomato necrotic streak virus
Tomato necrotic stunt virus
Tomato planta macho viroid
Tomato pseudo-curly top virus
Tomato ringspot virus
Tomato rugose mosaic virus
Tomato rugose yellow leaf curl virus
Tomato severe leaf curl Kalakada virus
Tomato severe leaf curl virus
Tomato severe rugose virus
Tomato spotted wilt orthotospovirus
Tomato torrado virus
Tomato twisted leaf virus
Tomato wrinkled mosaic virus
Tomato yellow leaf curl Axarquia virus
Tomato yellow leaf curl China alphasatellite
Tomato yellow leaf curl China betasatellite
Tomato yellow leaf curl China virus
Tomato yellow leaf curl Guangdong virus
Tomato yellow leaf curl Indonesia virus
Tomato yellow leaf curl Kanchanaburi virus
Tomato yellow leaf curl Malaga virus
Tomato yellow leaf curl Mali virus
Tomato yellow leaf curl Rajasthan betasatellite
Tomato yellow leaf curl Sardinia virus
Tomato yellow leaf curl Shandong betasatellite
Tomato yellow leaf curl Shuangbai virus
Tomato yellow leaf curl Thailand alphasatellite
Tomato yellow leaf curl Thailand betasatellite
Tomato yellow leaf curl Thailand virus
Tomato yellow leaf curl Vietnam betasatellite
Tomato yellow leaf curl Vietnam virus
Tomato yellow leaf curl virus
Tomato yellow leaf curl Yunnan alphasatellite
Tomato yellow leaf curl Yunnan betasatellite
Tomato yellow leaf curl Yunnan virus
Tomato yellow leaf distortion deltasatellite 1
Tomato yellow leaf distortion deltasatellite 2
Tomato yellow leaf distortion virus
Tomato yellow margin leaf curl virus
Tomato yellow mottle virus
Tomato yellow mottle-associated cytorhabdovirus
Tomato yellow ring orthotospovirus
Tomato yellow spot alphasatellite
Tomato yellow spot virus
Tomato yellow vein streak virus
Tomato zonate spot orthotospovirus
Tonate virus
Tongilchon ohlsrhavirus
Torchivirus A
Toros phlebovirus
Torque teno canis virus
Torque teno douroucouli virus
Torque teno equus virus 1
Torque teno felis virus
Torque teno felis virus 2
Torque teno midi virus 1
Torque teno midi virus 10
Torque teno midi virus 11
Torque teno midi virus 12
Torque teno midi virus 13
Torque teno midi virus 14
Torque teno midi virus 15
Torque teno midi virus 2
Torque teno midi virus 3
Torque teno midi virus 4
Torque teno midi virus 5
Torque teno midi virus 6
Torque teno midi virus 7
Torque teno midi virus 8
Torque teno midi virus 9
Torque teno mini virus 1
Torque teno mini virus 10
Torque teno mini virus 11
Torque teno mini virus 12
Torque teno mini virus 2
Torque teno mini virus 3
Torque teno mini virus 4
Torque teno mini virus 5
Torque teno mini virus 6
Torque teno mini virus 7
Torque teno mini virus 8
Torque teno mini virus 9
Torque teno seal virus 1
Torque teno seal virus 2
Torque teno seal virus 3
Torque teno seal virus 4
Torque teno seal virus 5
Torque teno seal virus 8
Torque teno seal virus 9
Torque teno sus virus 1a
Torque teno sus virus 1b
Torque teno sus virus k2a
Torque teno sus virus k2b
Torque teno tamarin virus
Torque teno tupaia virus
Torque teno virus 1
Torque teno virus 10
Torque teno virus 11
Torque teno virus 12
Torque teno virus 13
Torque teno virus 14
Torque teno virus 15
Torque teno virus 16
Torque teno virus 17
Torque teno virus 18
Torque teno virus 19
Torque teno virus 2
Torque teno virus 20
Torque teno virus 21
Torque teno virus 22
Torque teno virus 23
Torque teno virus 24
Torque teno virus 25
Torque teno virus 26
Torque teno virus 27
Torque teno virus 28
Torque teno virus 29
Torque teno virus 3
Torque teno virus 4
Torque teno virus 5
Torque teno virus 6
Torque teno virus 7
Torque teno virus 8
Torque teno virus 9
Torque teno zalophus virus 1
Toscana phlebovirus
Tottorivirus A
Tradescantia mild mosaic virus
Trager duck spleen necrosis virus
Trailing lespedeza virus 1
Tranosema rostrale bracovirus
Tree shrew mastadenovirus A
Trefoil betanucleorhabdovirus
Treisdeltapapillomavirus 1
Treisepsilonpapillomavirus 1
Treisetapapillomavirus 1
Treisiotapapillomavirus 1
Treiskappapapillomavirus 1
Treisthetapapillomavirus 1
Treiszetapapillomavirus 1
Trematomus bernacchii polyomavirus 1
Trematomus pennellii polyomavirus 1
Tremovirus A
Tremovirus B
Tres Almendras phlebovirus
Triatoma virus
Tribolium castaneum Woot virus
Trichomonas vaginalis virus 1
Trichomonas vaginalis virus 2
Trichomonas vaginalis virus 3
Trichomonas vaginalis virus 4
Trichoplusia ni ascovirus 2a
Trichoplusia ni granulovirus
Trichoplusia ni single nucleopolyhedrovirus
Trichoplusia ni TED virus
Trichoplusia ni virus
Tripneustis gratilla SURL virus
Triticum aestivum WIS2 virus
Triticum mosaic virus
Triumfetta yellow mosaic virus
Trivittatus orthobunyavirus
Trocara virus
Tropical soda apple mosaic virus
Tropivirus A
Tsukamurella virus TIN2
Tsukamurella virus TIN3
Tsukamurella virus TIN4
Tuber aestivum betaendornavirus
Tuber aestivum virus 1
Tuberose mild mosaic virus
Tuberose mild mottle virus
Tuhoko pararubulavirus 1
Tuhoko pararubulavirus 2
Tuhoko pararubulavirus 3
Tula orthohantavirus
Tulare apple mosaic virus
Tulip breaking virus
Tulip mild mottle mosaic ophiovirus
Tulip mosaic virus
Tulip virus X
Tunisvirus
Tupaia belangeri polyomavirus 1
Tupaia narmovirus
Tupaia tupavirus
Tupaiid betaherpesvirus 1
Turkey associated porprismacovirus 1
Turkey aviadenovirus B
Turkey aviadenovirus C
Turkey aviadenovirus D
Turkey siadenovirus A
Turkeypox virus
Turlock orthobunyavirus
Turnip crinkle virus
Turnip curly top virus
Turnip leaf roll virus
Turnip mosaic virus
Turnip rosette virus
Turnip vein-clearing virus
Turnip yellow mosaic virus
Turnip yellows virus
Turrinivirus 1
Turuna phlebovirus
Twisted-stalk chlorotic streak virus
Tylonycteris bat coronavirus HKU4
Tyuleniy virus

U

Uganda S virus
Ugandan cassava brown streak virus
Ullucus mild mottle virus
Ullucus virus C
Umatilla virus
Una virus
Ungulate bocaparvovirus 1
Ungulate bocaparvovirus 2
Ungulate bocaparvovirus 3
Ungulate bocaparvovirus 4
Ungulate bocaparvovirus 5
Ungulate bocaparvovirus 6
Ungulate bocaparvovirus 7
Ungulate bocaparvovirus 8
Ungulate chaphamaparvovirus 1
Ungulate copiparvovirus 1
Ungulate copiparvovirus 2
Ungulate copiparvovirus 3
Ungulate copiparvovirus 4
Ungulate copiparvovirus 5
Ungulate copiparvovirus 6
Ungulate erythroparvovirus 1
Ungulate protoparvovirus 1
Ungulate protoparvovirus 2
Ungulate tetraparvovirus 1
Ungulate tetraparvovirus 2
Ungulate tetraparvovirus 3
Ungulate tetraparvovirus 4
Upsilonpapillomavirus 1
Upsilonpapillomavirus 2
Upsilonpapillomavirus 3
UR2 sarcoma virus
Urbanus proteus nucleopolyhedrovirus
Uriurana phlebovirus
Urochloa hoja blanca tenuivirus
Urochloa streak virus
Urucuri phlebovirus
Ustilago maydis virus H1
Usutu virus
Utinga orthobunyavirus
Uukuniemi uukuvirus

V

Vaccinia virus
Vallota mosaic virus
Vanilla distortion mosaic virus
Vanilla latent virus
Vanilla virus X
Vaprio ledantevirus
Variola virus
Varroa destructor virus 1
Velvet bean golden mosaic virus
Velvet bean severe mosaic virus
Velvet tobacco mottle virus
Venezuelan equine encephalitis virus
Verbena latent virus
Verbena virus Y
Vernonia crinkle virus
Vernonia yellow vein betasatellite
Vernonia yellow vein Fujian alphasatellite
Vernonia yellow vein Fujian betasatellite
Vernonia yellow vein Fujian virus
Vernonia yellow vein virus
Verticillium dahliae chrysovirus 1
Vesicular exanthema of swine virus
Vespertilionid gammaherpesvirus 1
Vibrio virus 48B1
Vibrio virus 51A6
Vibrio virus 51A7
Vibrio virus 52B1
Vibrio virus A318
Vibrio virus Aphrodite1
Vibrio virus AS51
Vibrio virus Canoe
Vibrio virus Ceto
Vibrio virus CTXphi
Vibrio virus Cyclit
Vibrio virus fs1
Vibrio virus fs2
Vibrio virus ICP3
Vibrio virus JSF10
Vibrio virus JSF12
Vibrio virus JSF7
Vibrio virus K139
Vibrio virus Kappa
Vibrio virus KF1
Vibrio virus KF2
Vibrio virus KSF1
Vibrio virus KVP40
Vibrio virus MAR
Vibrio virus MAR10
Vibrio virus N4
Vibrio virus nt1
Vibrio virus OWB
Vibrio virus PG07
Vibrio virus phi3
Vibrio virus pTD1
Vibrio virus PV94
Vibrio virus pVp1
Vibrio virus SSP002
Vibrio virus Thalassa
Vibrio virus ValKK3
Vibrio virus Vc1
Vibrio virus VC8
Vibrio virus VCY
Vibrio virus VEN
Vibrio virus Vf33
Vibrio virus VFJ
Vibrio virus VfO3K6
Vibrio virus VGJ
Vibrio virus VHML
Vibrio virus VP2
Vibrio virus VP4
Vibrio virus VP4B
Vibrio virus VP5
Vibrio virus VP585
Vibrio virus Vp670
Vibrio virus VP882
Vibrio virus VP93
Vibrio virus VpV262
Vibrio virus VspSw1
Vicia cryptic virus
Vicia cryptic virus M
Vicia faba alphaendornavirus
Vicugna pacos polyomavirus 1
Vientovirus
Vigna yellow mosaic virus
Vinca leaf curl virus
Viola phlebovirus
Viper retrovirus
Visna-maedi virus
Voandzeia necrotic mosaic virus
Volepox virus
Volvox carteri Lueckenbuesser virus
Volvox carteri Osser virus
Votkovvirus S28C10

W

Wad Medani virus
Walkabout sunrhavirus
Wallal virus
Walleye dermal sarcoma virus
Walleye epidermal hyperplasia virus 1
Walleye epidermal hyperplasia virus 2
Warrego virus
Wasabi mottle virus
Waterbird 1 orthobornavirus
Watermelon bud necrosis orthotospovirus
Watermelon chlorotic stunt virus
Watermelon leaf mottle virus
Watermelon mosaic virus
Watermelon silver mottle orthotospovirus
Watermelon virus A
Weddel waterborne virus
Wenling crustavirus
Wenling mivirus
Wenzhou crustavirus
Wenzhou mammarenavirus
Wenzhou yingvirus
Wesselsbron virus
West African Asystasia virus 1
West African Asystasia virus 2
West African Asystasia virus 3
West Caucasian bat lyssavirus
West Nile virus
Western chimpanzee simian foamy virus
Western equine encephalitis virus
Western kangaroopox virus
Western lowland gorilla simian foamy virus
Whataroa virus
Wheat American striate mosaic cytorhabdovirus
Wheat dwarf India virus
Wheat dwarf virus
Wheat eqlid mosaic virus
Wheat spindle streak mosaic virus
Wheat streak mosaic virus
Wheat yellow leaf virus
Wheat yellow mosaic virus
Wheat yellow striate alphanucleorhabdovirus
White bream virus
White clover cryptic virus 1
White clover cryptic virus 2
White clover cryptic virus 3
White clover mosaic virus
White spot syndrome virus
White sucker hepatitis B virus
White-eye coronavirus HKU16
White-tufted-ear marmoset simian foamy virus
Whitefly associated Guatemala alphasatellite 1
Whitefly associated Guatemala alphasatellite 2
Whitefly associated Puerto Rico alphasatellite 1
Whitefly-associated begomovirus 1
Whitefly-associated begomovirus 2
Whitefly-associated begomovirus 3
Whitefly-associated begomovirus 4
Whitefly-associated begomovirus 6
Whitefly-associated begomovirus 7
Whitewater Arroyo mammarenavirus
Wigeon coronavirus HKU20
Wild cucumber mosaic virus
Wild melon banding virus
Wild onion symptomless virus
Wild potato mosaic virus
Wild tomato mosaic virus
Wild Vitis latent virus
Winged bean alphaendornavirus 1
Wiseana signata nucleopolyhedrovirus
Wissadula golden mosaic virus
Wissadula yellow mosaic virus
Wisteria badnavirus 1
Wisteria vein mosaic virus
Witwatersrand orthobunyavirus
Wolkberg orthobunyavirus
Wongabel hapavirus
Wongorr virus
Woodchuck hepatitis virus
Woodlouse peropuvirus
Woolly monkey hepatitis B virus
Woolly monkey sarcoma virus
Wound tumor virus
Wuchang arlivirus
Wuchang cockroach orthophasmavirus 1
Wuhan 4 insect cytorhabdovirus
Wuhan 5 insect cytorhabdovirus
Wuhan 6 insect cytorhabdovirus
Wuhan ledantevirus
Wuhan mivirus
Wuhan mosquito orthophasmavirus 1
Wuhan mosquito orthophasmavirus 2
Wuhan yingvirus
Wutai mosquito phasivirus
Wyeomyia orthobunyavirus

X

Xanthomonas virus Carpasina
Xanthomonas virus Cf1c
Xanthomonas virus CP1
Xanthomonas virus f20
Xanthomonas virus f30
Xanthomonas virus OP1
Xanthomonas virus OP2
Xanthomonas virus PhiL7
Xanthomonas virus XAJ24
Xanthomonas virus Xc10
Xanthomonas virus XcP1
Xanthomonas virus Xf109
Xanthomonas virus Xop411
Xanthomonas virus Xp10
Xanthophyllomyces dendrorhous virus L1A
Xanthophyllomyces dendrorhous virus L1B
Xapuri mammarenavirus
Xestia c-nigrum granulovirus
Xiburema arurhavirus
Xilang striavirus
Xincheng anphevirus
Xingshan alphanemrhavirus
Xinzhou alphanemrhavirus
Xinzhou mivirus
Xinzhou yingvirus
Xipapillomavirus 1
Xipapillomavirus 2
Xipapillomavirus 3
Xipapillomavirus 4
Xipapillomavirus 5
Xylella virus Prado
Xylella virus Salvo
Xylella virus Sano

Y

Y73 sarcoma virus
Yaba monkey tumor virus
Yacon necrotic mottle virus
Yakeshi orthohantavirus
Yam chlorotic mosaic virus
Yam chlorotic necrosis virus
Yam latent virus
Yam mild mosaic virus
Yam mosaic virus
Yam spherical virus
Yam virus X
Yambean mosaic virus
Yaounde virus
Yata ephemerovirus
Yellow fever virus
Yellow head virus
Yellow oat grass mosaic virus
Yellow tailflower mild mottle virus
Yellow-breasted capuchin simian foamy virus
Yellowtail ascites virus
Yerba mate alphaendornavirus
Yerba mate chlorosis-associated cytorhabdovirus
Yersinia virus AP10
Yersinia virus AP5
Yersinia virus Berlin
Yersinia virus D1
Yersinia virus fHeYen301
Yersinia virus fPS53
Yersinia virus fPS54ocr
Yersinia virus fPS59
Yersinia virus fPS9
Yersinia virus ISAO8
Yersinia virus L413C
Yersinia virus Phi80-18
Yersinia virus phiR201
Yersinia virus PST
Yersinia virus PYPS50
Yersinia virus R1RT
Yersinia virus R8-01
Yersinia virus TG1
Yersinia virus YeF10
Yersinia virus Yen9-04
Yersinia virus YeO3-12
Yersinia virus Yepe2
Yersinia virus Yepf
Yersinia virus YpPY
Yersinia virus YpsPG
Yichang insect goukovirus
Yokapox virus
Yokose virus
Yongjia ledantevirus
Yongjia uukuvirus
Youcai mosaic virus
Yug Bogdanovac vesiculovirus
Yunnan orbivirus

Z

Zahedan zarhavirus
Zaire ebolavirus
Zaliv Terpeniya uukuvirus
Zalophus californianus polyomavirus 1
Zantedeschia mild mosaic virus
Zea mays Hopscotch virus
Zea mays Opie2 virus
Zea mays Prem2 virus
Zea mays Sto4 virus
Zea mosaic virus
Zebra finch circovirus
Zegla orthobunyavirus
Zerdali phlebovirus
Zetaarterivirus ugarco 1
Zetapapillomavirus 1
Zika virus
Zoostera marina amalgavirus 1
Zoostera marina amalgavirus 2
Zucchini green mottle mosaic virus
Zucchini lethal chlorosis orthotospovirus
Zucchini shoestring virus
Zucchini tigre mosaic virus
Zucchini yellow fleck virus
Zucchini yellow mosaic virus
Zurich hartmanivirus
Zygocactus virus X
Zygosaccharomyces bailii virus Z

See also

 Glossary of virology
 List of virus genera
 List of virus taxa
 Table of clinically important viruses
 Virology
 Virus classification

References

External links

List of viruses by family and group
Viruses by genome type

Species
Virus species
bg:Класификация на вирусите